There are about 2,400 known moth species of the Democratic Republic of the Congo. The moths (mostly nocturnal) and butterflies (mostly diurnal) together make up the taxonomic order Lepidoptera.

This is a list of moth species which have been recorded in the Democratic Republic of the Congo.

Adelidae
Ceromitia systelitis Meyrick, 1921

Alucitidae
Alucita fletcheriana (Ghesquière, 1940)

Anomoeotidae
Anomoeotes diaphana Hering, 1932
Anomoeotes nigrivenosus Butler, 1893
Anomoeotes simulatrix Talbot, 1929
Staphylinochrous angustifascia Hering, 1937
Staphylinochrous approximata Hering, 1937
Staphylinochrous elongata Hering, 1937
Staphylinochrous flavida Hampson, 1920
Staphylinochrous fulva Hampson, 1910
Thermochrous stenocraspis Hampson, 1910
Thermochrous succisa Hering, 1937

Arctiidae
Acantharctia metaleuca Hampson, 1901
Acantharctia mundata (Walker, 1865)
Acantharctia nivea Aurivillius, 1900
Acantharctia tenuifasciata Hampson, 1910
Afraloa bifurca (Walker, 1855)
Afrasura indecisa (Walker, 1869)
Afrasura numida (Holland, 1893)
Afrasura obliterata (Walker, 1864)
Afrasura peripherica (Strand, 1912)
Afrasura rivulosa (Walker, 1854)
Afrasura violacea (Cieslak & Häuser, 2006)
Afroarctia bergeri Toulgoët, 1978
Afroarctia kenyana (Rothschild, 1933)
Afroarctia sjostedti (Aurivillius, 1900)
Afrowatsonius burgeoni (Talbot, 1928)
Afrowatsonius marginalis (Walker, 1855)
Aglossosia deceptans Hampson, 1914
Alpenus diversata (Hampson, 1916)
Alpenus dollmani (Hampson, 1920)
Alpenus intacta (Hampson, 1916)
Alpenus investigatorum (Karsch, 1898)
Alpenus maculosa (Stoll, 1781)
Alpenus nigropunctata (Bethune-Baker, 1908)
Amata albobasis Kiriakoff, 1954
Amata alenicola (Strand, 1912)
Amata alicia (Butler, 1876)
Amata bondo (Kiriakoff, 1965)
Amata endocrocis (Hampson, 1903)
Amata hellei (Romieux, 1935)
Amata hemiphoenica (Hampson, 1910)
Amata hypomela Kiriakoff, 1954
Amata interniplaga (Mabille, 1890)
Amata jacksoni Rothschild, 1910
Amata kenredi (Rothschild, 1910)
Amata leucerythra (Holland, 1893)
Amata marinoides Kiriakoff, 1954
Amata miozona (Hampson, 1910)
Amata obraztsovi Kiriakoff, 1954
Amata phaeobasis (Hampson, 1907)
Amata schoutedeni Kiriakoff, 1954
Amata stanleyi (Kiriakoff, 1965)
Amata tomasina (Butler, 1876)
Amata uelleburgensis (Strand, 1912)
Amata waldowi (Grünberg, 1907)
Amerila affinis (Rothschild, 1910)
Amerila atrivena (Hampson, 1907)
Amerila brunnea (Hampson, 1901)
Amerila bubo (Walker, 1855)
Amerila carneola (Hampson, 1916)
Amerila fennia (Druce, 1887)
Amerila leucoptera (Hampson, 1901)
Amerila lineolata (Kiriakoff, 1954)
Amerila luteibarba (Hampson, 1901)
Amerila mulleri Häuser & Boppré, 1997
Amerila nigrivenosa (Grünberg, 1910)
Amerila niveivitrea (Bartel, 1903)
Amerila puella (Fabricius, 1793)
Amerila rufifemur (Walker, 1855)
Amerila thermochroa (Hampson, 1916)
Amerila vidua (Cramer, 1780)
Amphicallia pactolicus (Butler, 1888)
Amphicallia thelwalli (Druce, 1882)
Amsacta aureolimbata Rothschild, 1910
Amsacta grammiphlebia Hampson, 1901
Anaphosia astrigata Hampson, 1910
Anaphosia caloxantha Hering, 1932
Anaphosia cyanogramma Hampson, 1903
Anaphosia eurygrapha Hampson, 1910
Anaphosia extranea Debauche, 1938
Anaphosia parallela Bethune-Baker, 1911
Anaphosia pectinata Hampson, 1910
Anapisa dufranei Kiriakoff, 1952
Anapisa histrio (Kiriakoff, 1953)
Anapisa melaleuca (Holland, 1898)
Anapisa metarctioides (Hampson, 1907)
Anapisa monotica (Holland, 1893)
Anapisa schoutedeni Kiriakoff, 1952
Anapisa vanoyei (Kiriakoff, 1952)
Apisa canescens Walker, 1855
Apisa fontainei Kiriakoff, 1959
Apisa grisescens (Dufrane, 1945)
Apisa subargentea Joicey & Talbot, 1921
Argina amanda (Boisduval, 1847)
Argina leonina (Walker, 1865)
Asura congoensis Kühne, 2007
Asura eala Kühne, 2007
Asura hermanni Kühne, 2007
Asura mutabilis Kühne, 2007
Asura russula Kiriakoff, 1963
Asura sagenaria (Wallengren, 1860)
Asura spinata Kühne, 2007
Asura subfulvia Kiriakoff, 1954
Asura versicolor Kühne, 2007
Balacra affinis Rothschild, 1910
Balacra aurivilliusi Kiriakoff, 1957
Balacra batesi Druce, 1910
Balacra belga Kiriakoff, 1954
Balacra caeruleifascia Walker, 1856
Balacra compsa (Jordan, 1904)
Balacra daphaena (Hampson, 1898)
Balacra elegans Aurivillius, 1892
Balacra flavimacula Walker, 1856
Balacra fontanei Kiriakoff, 1953
Balacra haemalea Holland, 1893
Balacra herona (Druce, 1887)
Balacra humphreyi Rothschild, 1912
Balacra jaensis Bethune-Baker, 1927
Balacra nigripennis (Aurivillius, 1904)
Balacra preussi (Aurivillius, 1904)
Balacra pulchra Aurivillius, 1892
Balacra rattrayi (Rothschild, 1910)
Balacra rubricincta Holland, 1893
Balacra rubrostriata (Aurivillius, 1892)
Balacra similis Hulstaert, 1923
Balacra tamsi (Kiriakoff, 1957)
Bergeria bourgognei Kiriakoff, 1952
Bergeria haematochrysa Kiriakoff, 1952
Bergeria octava Kiriakoff, 1961
Binna penicillata Walker, 1865
Binna scita (Walker, 1865)
Carcinarctia kivuensis Joicey & Talbot, 1924
Carcinarctia laeliodes Hampson, 1916
Carcinarctia rufa Joicey & Talbot, 1921
Carcinopodia schoutedeni Strand, 1918
Caripodia aurantiacella Kiriakoff, 1954
Caripodia chrysargyria Hampson, 1900
Caripodia consimilis Hampson, 1918
Caripodia semisericea Kiriakoff, 1954
Caryatis phileta (Drury, 1782)
Caryatis stenoperas Hampson, 1910
Ceryx albimacula (Walker, 1854)
Ceryx antiopa Kiriakoff, 1953
Ceryx ciprianii Berio, 1937
Ceryx salutator Kiriakoff, 1965
Cragia distigmata (Hampson, 1901)
Creatonotos leucanioides Holland, 1893
Creatonotos punctivitta (Walker, 1854)
Cyana delicata (Walker, 1854)
Cyana ellipsis Karisch & Dall'Asta, 2010
Cyana hecqi Karisch & Dall'Asta, 2010
Cyana klohsi Karisch, 2003
Cyana luchoana Karisch, 2003
Cyana pallidilinea Karisch, 2003
Cyana paramargarethae Karisch & Dall'Asta, 2010
Cyana pretoriae (Distant, 1897)
Cyana quentini Karisch, 2003
Cyana rubristriga (Holland, 1893)
Cyana rufeola Karisch & Dall'Asta, 2010
Cyana ueleana Karisch, 2003
Cyana ugandana (Strand, 1912)
Disparctia vittata (Druce, 1898)
Dubatolovia neurophaea (Hampson, 1911)
Eilema amaura Hering, 1926
Eilema bifasciata Hampson, 1900
Eilema bilati (Dufrane, 1945)
Eilema danieli Kiriakoff, 1954
Eilema gracilipennis (Wallengren, 1860)
Eilema leia (Hampson, 1901)
Eilema mesosticta Hampson, 1911
Eilema peperita (Hampson, 1901)
Eilema rufofasciata (Rothschild, 1912)
Eilema sanguicosta (Hampson, 1901)
Eilema tricolorana Kiriakoff, 1954
Eilema triplaiola (Bethune-Baker, 1911)
Eilema vicara Strand, 1922
Epilacydes simulans Butler, 1875
Epitoxis ceryxoides Berio, 1940
Epitoxis stempfferi Kiriakoff, 1953
Eressa pleurosticta Hampson, 1910
Estigmene ansorgei Rothschild, 1910
Estigmene neuriastis Hampson, 1907
Estigmene ochreomarginata Bethune-Baker, 1909
Estigmene sabulosa Romieux, 1943
Estigmene tenuistrigata (Hampson, 1900)
Estigmene trivitta (Walker, 1855)
Euchromia guineensis (Fabricius, 1775)
Euchromia lethe (Fabricius, 1775)
Euchromia schoutedeni Debauche, 1936
Eyralpenus metaxantha (Hampson, 1920)
Eyralpenus postflavida (Rothschild, 1933)
Eyralpenus scioana (Oberthür, 1880)
Galtara doriae (Oberthür, 1880)
Galtara elongata (Swinhoe, 1907)
Galtara notabilis Toulgoët, 1980
Galtara reticulata (Hampson, 1909)
Hippurarctia ferrigera (Druce, 1910)
Hippurarctia taymansi (Rothschild, 1910)
Ilemodes isogyna Romieux, 1935
Ischnarctia brunnescens Bartel, 1903
Ischnarctia cinerea (Pagenstecher, 1903)
Kiriakoffalia lemairei (Toulgoët, 1976)
Lempkeella avellana (Kiriakoff, 1957)
Leptoceryx caudatula (Kiriakoff, 1953)
Leptoceryx pusilla Kiriakoff, 1953
Logunovium nigricosta (Holland, 1893)
Logunovium scortillum Wallengren, 1875
Mecistorhabdia haematoessa (Holland, 1893)
Meganaclia perpusilla (Walker, 1856)
Melisa croceipes (Aurivillius, 1892)
Melisa diptera (Walker, 1854)
Menegites nivea Kiriakoff, 1954
Metamicroptera rotundata Hulstaert, 1923
Metarctia brunneipennis Hering, 1932
Metarctia burungae Debauche, 1942
Metarctia collocalia Kiriakoff, 1957
Metarctia didyma Kiriakoff, 1957
Metarctia fario (Kiriakoff, 1957)
Metarctia flavicincta Aurivillius, 1900
Metarctia flavivena Hampson, 1901
Metarctia forsteri Kiriakoff, 1955
Metarctia haematica Holland, 1893
Metarctia heringi Kiriakoff, 1957
Metarctia inconspicua Holland, 1892
Metarctia infausta Kiriakoff, 1957
Metarctia lateritia Herrich-Schäffer, 1855
Metarctia longipalpis Hulstaert, 1923
Metarctia morag Kiriakoff, 1957
Metarctia morosa Kiriakoff, 1957
Metarctia phaeoptera Hampson, 1909
Metarctia rubribasa Bethune-Baker, 1911
Metarctia rubripuncta Hampson, 1898
Metarctia rufescens Walker, 1855
Metarctia schoutedeni Kiriakoff, 1953
Metarctia seydeliana (Kiriakoff, 1953)
Metarctia subincarnata (Kiriakoff, 1954)
Metarctia upembae Kiriakoff, 1949
Metarctia venustissima Kiriakoff, 1961
Metarctia virgata Joicey & Talbot, 1921
Micralarctia punctulatum (Wallengren, 1860)
Myopsyche bokumae Kiriakoff, 1954
Myopsyche pallidicincta Kiriakoff, 1954
Myopsyche sankuruica Kiriakoff, 1954
Nacliodes microsippia Strand, 1912
Nanna collinsii Kühne, 2007
Neophemula vitrina (Oberthür, 1909)
Neuroxena ansorgei Kirby, 1896
Neuroxena postrubidus (Rothschild, 1933)
Nyctemera apicalis (Walker, 1854)
Nyctemera chalcosidia (Hampson, 1910)
Nyctemera chromis Druce, 1882
Nyctemera druna (Swinhoe, 1904)
Nyctemera hemixantha (Aurivillius, 1904)
Nyctemera itokina (Aurivillius, 1904)
Nyctemera leuconoe Hopffer, 1857
Nyctemera perspicua (Walker, 1854)
Nyctemera rattrayi (Swinhoe, 1904)
Nyctemera restrictum (Butler, 1894)
Nyctemera xanthura (Plötz, 1880)
Oreoceryx aenea Kiriakoff, 1953
Ovenna simulans (Mabille, 1878)
Ovenna subgriseola (Strand, 1912)
Ovenna vicaria (Walker, 1854)
Palaeosiccia punctata Hampson, 1900
Paralacydes arborifera (Butler, 1875)
Paralacydes bivittata (Bartel, 1903)
Paralacydes decemmaculata (Rothschild, 1916)
Paralpenus wintgensi (Strand, 1909)
Paramelisa lophura Aurivillius, 1905
Paramyopsyche wittei Debauche, 1942
Pericaliella melanodisca (Hampson, 1907)
Phryganopsis alberici Dufrane, 1945
Phryganopsis angulifascia (Strand, 1912)
Phryganopsis flavicosta Hampson, 1901
Phryganopsis tryphosa Kiriakoff, 1958
Popoudina aliena (Kiriakoff, 1954)
Pseudlepista flavicosta Hampson, 1910
Pseudmelisa chalybsa Hampson, 1910
Pseudodiptera alberici (Dufrane, 1945)
Pseudodiptera clypeatus (Kiriakoff, 1965)
Pseudodiptera dufranei (Kiriakoff, 1965)
Pseudodiptera musiforme Kaye, 1918
Pseudothyretes kamitugensis (Dufrane, 1945)
Pseudothyretes nigrita (Kiriakoff, 1961)
Pseudothyretes perpusilla (Walker, 1856)
Pseudothyretes rubicundula (Strand, 1912)
Pusiola ampla (Debauche, 1942)
Pusiola celida (Bethune-Baker, 1911)
Pusiola derelicta (Debauche, 1942)
Pusiola fageli (Kiriakoff, 1954)
Pusiola isabellina (Kiriakoff, 1954)
Pusiola leiodes (Kiriakoff, 1954)
Pusiola ochreata (Hampson, 1901)
Pusiola roscidella (Kiriakoff, 1954)
Pusiola sordidula (Kiriakoff, 1954)
Pusiola sorghicolor (Kiriakoff, 1954)
Pusiola straminea (Hampson, 1901)
Pusiola unicolor (Kiriakoff, 1954)
Radiarctia lutescens (Walker, 1854)
Radiarctia melanochoria Hering, 1932
Radiarctia rhodesiana (Hampson, 1900)
Rhabdomarctia rubrilineata (Bethune-Baker, 1911)
Rhipidarctia aurora Kiriakoff, 1957
Rhipidarctia conradti (Oberthür, 1911)
Rhipidarctia crameri Kiriakoff, 1961
Rhipidarctia forsteri (Kiriakoff, 1953)
Rhipidarctia invaria (Walker, 1856)
Rhipidarctia rhodosoma Kiriakoff, 1957
Rhipidarctia rubrovitta (Aurivillius, 1904)
Rhipidarctia saturata Kiriakoff, 1957
Secusio deilemera Talbot, 1929
Secusio discoidalis Talbot, 1929
Siccia bicolorata Romieux, 1937
Siccia gypsia Hampson, 1914
Siccia melanospila Hampson, 1911
Siccia overlaeti Kühne, 2007
Spilosoma albiventre Kiriakoff, 1963
Spilosoma aurantiaca (Holland, 1893)
Spilosoma batesi (Rothschild, 1910)
Spilosoma curvilinea Walker, 1855
Spilosoma dufranei Kiriakoff, 1965
Spilosoma immaculata Bartel, 1903
Spilosoma maniemae Kiriakoff, 1965
Spilosoma metaleuca (Hampson, 1905)
Spilosoma nyasana Rothschild, 1933
Spilosoma occidens (Rothschild, 1910)
Spilosoma penultimum Kiriakoff, 1965
Spilosoma quadrilunata (Hampson, 1901)
Spilosoma rava (Druce, 1898)
Spilosoma semihyalina Bartel, 1903
Spilosoma sulphurea Bartel, 1903
Spilosoma tenuivena Kiriakoff, 1965
Spilosoma togoensis Bartel, 1903
Spilosoma unipuncta (Hampson, 1905)
Stenarctia quadripunctata Aurivillius, 1900
Stenilema quadrinotata Kiriakoff, 1965
Teracotona euprepia Hampson, 1900
Teracotona melanocera (Hampson, 1920)
Teracotona multistrigata Joicey & Talbot, 1924
Teracotona pardalina Bartel, 1903
Teracotona translucens (Grünberg, 1907)
Teracotona wittei (Debauche, 1942)
Thyretes monteiroi Butler, 1876
Thyretes negus Oberthür, 1878
Thyretes signivenis Hering, 1937
Thyrogonia aurantiiventris Kiriakoff, 1953
Thyrogonia hampsoni Kiriakoff, 1953
Trichaeta bivittata (Walker, 1864)
Trichaeta fulvescens (Walker, 1854)
Utetheisa pulchella (Linnaeus, 1758)
Zadadrina metallica Kiriakoff, 1954

Autostichidae
Afrosymmoca seydeli Gozmány, 1966
Afrosymmoca straminea Gozmány, 1966
Dyscordaxis pygmeus Gozmány, 1975

Bombycidae
Racinoa metallescens (Möschler)

Brahmaeidae
Dactyloceras barnsi (Joicey & Talbot, 1924)
Dactyloceras ducarmei Bouyer, 2002
Dactyloceras tridentata (Conte, 1911)

Carposinidae
Carposina altivaga Meyrick, 1925

Coleophoridae
Coleophora bantuella Baldizzone & van der Wolf, 2005
Coleophora crossanthes Meyrick, 1938
Coleophora discopunctata Baldizzone & van der Wolf, 2005
Coleophora fragilella Baldizzone & van der Wolf, 2005
Coleophora frivolella Baldizzone & van der Wolf, 2005
Coleophora katangica Baldizzone & van der Wolf, 2005
Coleophora romieuxi Baldizzone & van der Wolf, 2005
Coleophora terebrans Baldizzone & van der Wolf, 2005
Coleophora tetrodonta Baldizzone & van der Wolf, 2005
Neoblastobasis perisella Adamski, 2010

Cosmopterigidae
Cosmopterix luteoapicalis Sinev, 2002
Gisilia sclerodes (Meyrick, 1909)
Macrobathra crococephala Meyrick, 1936

Cossidae
Macrocossus toluminus (Druce, 1887)
Oreocossus kilimanjarensis (Holland, 1892)

Crambidae
Aethaloessa floridalis (Zeller, 1852)
Ancylolomia capensis Zeller, 1852
Ancylolomia gracilis Fawcett, 1917
Angustalius besucheti (Błeszyński, 1963)
Antigastra catalaunalis (Duponchel, 1833)
Argyractis tripunctalis (Snellen, 1872)
Botyodes asialis Guenée, 1854
Cadarena sinuata (Fabricius, 1781)
Caffrocrambus democritus Bassi, 1994
Caffrocrambus heraclitus Bassi, 1994
Caffrocrambus parmenides Bassi, 1994
Calamotropha abjectella Snellen, 1872
Calamotropha robustella Snellen, 1872
Cangetta hartoghialis (Snellen, 1872)
Circobotys sinisalis (Walker, 1859)
Cnaphalocrocis poeyalis (Boisduval, 1833)
Conotalis nigroradians (Mabille, 1900)
Cotachena smaragdina (Butler, 1875)
Crocidolomia pavonana (Fabricius, 1794)
Cryptosara auralis (Snellen, 1872)
Culladia achroellum (Mabille, 1900)
Culladia inconspicuellus (Snellen, 1872)
Desmia incomposita (Bethune-Baker, 1909)
Diaphana indica (Saunders, 1851)
Epipagis ocellata (Hampson, 1916)
Eporidia dariusalis Walker, 1859
Euchromius ocellea (Haworth, 1811)
Euclasta varii Popescu-Gorj & Constantinescu, 1973
Ghesquierellana hirtusalis (Walker, 1859)
Glyphodes basifascialis Hampson, 1898
Haritalodes derogata (Fabricius, 1775)
Herpetogramma licarsisalis (Walker, 1859)
Herpetogramma phaeopteralis (Guenée, 1854)
Hydriris ornatalis (Duponchel, 1832)
Leucinodes orbonalis Guenée, 1854
Maruca vitrata (Fabricius, 1787)
Metoeca foedalis (Guenée, 1854)
Niveocatharylla romieuxi Bassi, 1999
Nomophila brevispinalis Munroe, 1973
Nomophila noctuella ([Denis & Schiffermüller], 1775)
Omiodes indicata (Fabricius, 1775)
Omiodes poeonalis (Walker, 1859)
Orphanostigma abruptalis (Walker, 1859)
Palpita bonjongalis (Plötz, 1880)
Palpita metallata (Fabricius, 1781)
Parapoynx fluctuosalis (Zeller, 1852)
Parotis arachnealis (Walker, 1859)
Parotis squamitibialis (Strand, 1912)
Parotis triangulalis (Strand, 1912)
Phostria flavipectus (Bethune-Baker, 1909)
Phostria hesusalis (Walker, 1859)
Phostria stygichroa (Bethune-Baker, 1909)
Phryganodes biguttata Hampson, 1898
Pilocrocis nubilinea Bethune-Baker, 1909
Pimelephila ghesquierei Tams, 1930
Pleuroptya aegrotalis (Zeller, 1852)
Pleuroptya balteata (Fabricius, 1798)
Psara bipunctalis (Fabricius, 1794)
Pseudocatharylla allecto Bassi, 1999
Pseudocatharylla shafferi (Bassi, 1999)
Pseudocatharylla submikengella Błeszyński, 1964
Pycnarmon diaphana (Cramer, 1779)
Pyrausta flavimarginalis (Hampson, 1913)
Pyrausta interfixalis (Walker, 1869)
Pyrausta phaenicealis (Hübner, 1818)
Sebrus argus Bassi, 1995
Spoladea recurvalis (Fabricius, 1775)
Stemorrhages sericea (Drury, 1773)
Syllepte erebarcha (Meyrick, 1939)
Syllepte fulviceps (Bethune-Baker, 1909)
Syllepte neurogramma (Meyrick, 1939)
Syllepte purpurascens Hampson, 1899
Syllepte torsipex (Hampson, 1898)
Ulopeza conigeralis Zeller, 1852
Viettessa bethalis (Viette, 1958)
Zebronia phenice (Cramer, 1780)

Drepanidae
Callidrepana macnultyi Watson, 1965
Callidrepana serena Watson, 1965
Epicampoptera andersoni (Tams, 1925)
Epicampoptera marantica (Tams, 1930)
Epicampoptera robusta Watson, 1965
Epicampoptera seydeli Watson, 1965
Epicampoptera strandi Bryk, 1913
Epicampoptera tamsi Watson, 1965
Gonoreta angulosa Watson, 1965
Gonoreta forcipulata Watson, 1965
Gonoreta opacifinis Watson, 1965
Gonoreta subtilis (Bryk, 1913)
Isospidia brunneola (Holland, 1893)
Negera natalensis (Felder, 1874)
Negera ramosa Watson, 1965
Spidia fenestrata Butler, 1878
Spidia smithi (Warren, 1902)
Spidia subviridis (Warren, 1899)
Uranometra oculata (Holland, 1893)

Elachistidae
Eretmograptis coniodoxa Meyrick, 1938
Orophia haemorrhanta (Meyrick, 1924)
Urodeta acerba Sruoga & J. de Prins, 2011
Urodeta bucera Sruoga & J. de Prins, 2011
Urodeta talea Sruoga & J. de Prins, 2011

Eupterotidae
Camerunia flava Aurivillius, 1904
Catajana bimaculata (Dewitz, 1879)
Epijana cinerea Holland, 1893
Epijana cosima (Plötz, 1880)
Epijana latifasciata Dall'Asta & Poncin, 1980
Epijana meridionalis Dall'Asta & Poncin, 1980
Hibrildes crawshayi Butler, 1896
Hibrildes norax Druce, 1887
Hoplojana insignifica Rothschild, 1917
Jana eurymas Herrich-Schäffer, 1854
Jana fletcheri Berger, 1980
Jana gracilis Walker, 1855
Jana obscura Aurivillius, 1893
Jana preciosa Aurivillius, 1893
Jana pseudostrigina Rothschild, 1917
Janomima dannfelti (Aurivillius, 1893)
Janomima ibandana Dall'Asta, 1979
Janomima mariana (White, 1843)
Lichenopteryx scotina Hering, 1932
Phiala alba Aurivillius, 1893
Phiala costipuncta (Herrich-Schäffer, 1855)
Phiala cubicularis Strand, 1911
Phiala maxima Kühne, 2007
Phiala nigrolineata Aurivillius, 1903
Phiala postmedialis Strand, 1911
Phiala pseudatomaria Strand, 1911
Phiala simplex Aurivillius, 1904
Phiala specialis Kühne, 2007
Phiala ueleae Kühne, 2007
Stenoglene bipartita (Rothschild, 1917)
Stenoglene bipunctatus (Aurivillius, 1909)
Stenoglene brunneofasciata Dall'Asta & Poncin, 1980
Stenoglene citrinoides Dall'Asta & Poncin, 1980
Stenoglene citrinus (Druce, 1886)
Stenoglene decellei Dall'Asta & Poncin, 1980
Stenoglene dehanicus (Strand, 1911)
Stenoglene fontainei Dall'Asta & Poncin, 1980
Stenoglene fouassini Dall'Asta & Poncin, 1980
Stenoglene latimaculata Dall'Asta & Poncin, 1980
Stenoglene nivalis (Rothschild, 1917)
Stenoglene obtusus (Walker, 1864)
Stenoglene opalina Druce, 1910
Stenoglene parvula Dall'Asta & Poncin, 1980
Stenoglene paulisi Dall'Asta & Poncin, 1980
Stenoglene pellucida Joicey & Talbot, 1924
Stenoglene plagiatus (Aurivillius, 1911)
Stenoglene preussi (Aurivillius, 1893)
Stenoglene roseus (Druce, 1886)
Stenoglene shabae Dall'Asta & Poncin, 1980
Stenoglene thelda (Druce, 1887)
Stenoglene uelei Dall'Asta & Poncin, 1980
Stenoglene uniformis Dall'Asta & Poncin, 1980

Gelechiidae
Cymotricha leontovitchi Ghesquière, 1940
Dactylethrella bryophilella (Walsingham, 1891)
Dichomeris pammiges Ghesquière, 1940
Paltoloma paleata Ghesquière, 1940
Pectinophora gossypiella (Saunders, 1844)
Phthorimaea operculella (Zeller, 1873)
Prasodryas opalina Ghesquière, 1940
Ptilothyris aglaocrossa Meyrick, 1935
Ptilothyris brachysema Meyrick, 1938
Ptilothyris crocophracta Meyrick, 1938
Ptilothyris loxocasis Meyrick, 1938
Ptilothyris nausicaa Meyrick, 1926
Ptilothyris nemophorella Ghesquière, 1940
Ptilothyris porphyrea Ghesquière, 1940
Ptilothyris purpurea Walsingham, 1897
Ptilothyris serangota Meyrick, 1932
Scrobipalpa aptatella (Walker, 1864)
Scrobipalpa ergasima (Meyrick, 1916)
Sitotroga cerealella (Olivier, 1789)
Trichembola oreia Ghesquière, 1940
Trichembola palynata Ghesquière, 1940
Trichotaphe phaeothina Ghesquière, 1940

Geometridae
Acollesis oxychora Prout, 1930
Aletis helcita (Linnaeus, 1763)
Anoectomychus eutoeodes (Prout, 1934)
Antharmostes interalbicans Warren, 1902
Antharmostes marginata (Warren, 1897)
Antharmostes orinophragma Prout, 1930
Antharmostes simplicimargo Prout, 1917
Antitrygodes callibotrys Prout, 1918
Aphilopota melanommata Prout, 1954
Aphilopota nubilata Prout, 1954
Aphilopota phanerostigma Prout, 1917
Aphilopota scapularia (Snellen, 1872)
Aphilopota symphronima Prout, 1954
Archichlora devoluta (Walker, 1861)
Archichlora phyllobrota (Holland, 1920)
Ascotis reciprocaria (Walker, 1860)
Asthenotricha dentatissima Warren, 1899
Asthenotricha malostigma Prout, 1921
Asthenotricha polydora Debauche, 1938
Asthenotricha psephotaenia Prout, 1935
Asthenotricha pythia Debauche, 1938
Asthenotricha semidivisa Warren, 1901
Asthenotricha straba Prout, 1921
Bathycolpodes excavata (Warren, 1898)
Bathycolpodes implumis Prout, 1930
Bathycolpodes semigrisea (Warren, 1897)
Biston abruptaria (Walker, 1869)
Biston basanga Karisch, 2005
Biston dargei (Herbulot, 1973)
Biston johannaria (Oberthür, 1913)
Biston subocularia (Mabille, 1893)
Blaboplutodes desmeti Karisch, 2004
Cabera fulgurata Debauche, 1938
Cabera monacaria Debauche, 1938
Cacostegania obscurata (Warren, 1905)
Cartaletis gracilis (Möschler, 1887)
Cartaletis tenuimargo Prout, 1916
Cartaletis variabilis (Butler, 1878)
Cheroscelis oospila Prout, 1912
Chiasmia angolaria (Snellen, 1872)
Chiasmia austera (Prout, 1932)
Chiasmia rectistriaria (Herrich-Schäffer, 1854)
Chiasmia subcurvaria (Mabille, 1897)
Chiasmia umbrata (Warren, 1897)
Chrysocraspeda leighata Warren, 1904
Cleora argillacea (Warren, 1900)
Cleora derogaria (Snellen, 1872)
Cleora rostella D. S. Fletcher, 1967
Cleora thyris D. S. Fletcher, 1967
Coenina aurivena Butler, 1898
Colocleora ansorgei (Warren, 1901)
Colocleora clarivenata (Prout, 1918)
Colocleora smithi (Warren, 1904)
Comibaena barnsi Prout, 1930
Conolophia conscitaria (Walker, 1861)
Conolophia rectistrigaria Rebel, 1914
Cyclophora dewitzi (Prout, 1920)
Cyclophora leonaria (Walker, 1861)
Dasymacaria ansorgei Warren, 1901
Dorsifulcrum cephalotes (Walker, 1869)
Drepanogynis tenoris (Prout, 1934)
Ecpetala caesiplaga (Prout, 1935)
Ectropis amphitromera Prout, 1911
Ectropis ocellata Warren, 1902
Eois laxipecten Herbulot, 2000
Epigynopteryx ansorgei (Warren, 1901)
Epigynopteryx maculosata (Warren, 1901)
Epigynopteryx termininota Prout, 1934
Erastria albosignata (Walker, 1863)
Erastria madecassaria (Boisduval, 1833)
Ereunetea minor (Holland, 1893)
Ereunetea semifumida Warren, 1909
Eupithecia dilucida (Warren, 1899)
Eupithecia semipallida Janse, 1933
Geodena flaviventer (Warren, 1909)
Geodena quadrigutta Walker, 1856
Geolyces attesaria Walker, 1860
Haplolabida sjostedti (Aurivillius, 1910)
Hydrelia argyridia (Butler, 1894)
Hylemeridia eurema (Plötz, 1880)
Hypocoela turpisaria (Swinhoe, 1904)
Idaea prucholoma (Prout, 1932)
Idaea pulveraria (Snellen, 1872)
Idiodes flexilinea (Warren, 1898)
Idiodes pectinata (Herbulot, 1966)
Isturgia exospilata (Walker, 1861)
Lissoblemma hamularia (Snellen, 1872)
Lissoblemma viridifusa Warren, 1902
Malgassapeira mixtilinea (Warren, 1909)
Melinoessa aemonia (Swinhoe, 1904)
Melinoessa asteria Prout, 1934
Metallochlora misera Prout, 1920
Miantochora venerata (Mabille, 1879)
Milocera diffusata (Warren, 1902)
Mimoclystia euthygramma (Prout, 1921)
Narthecusa tenuiorata Walker, 1862
Nothylemera vinolibata Prout, 1932
Ochroplutodes bisecta (Warren, 1904)
Ochroplutodes hecqi Karisch, 2008
Ochroplutodes irregularis Karisch, 2008
Ochroplutodes variabilis Karisch, 2008
Omphalucha brunnea (Warren, 1899)
Oxyfidonia pallidisecta Prout, 1915
Piercia ansorgei (Bethune-Baker, 1913)
Pitthea agenoria Druce, 1890
Pitthea argentiplaga Warren, 1897
Pitthea caesarea Rebel, 1914
Pitthea continua Walker, 1854
Pitthea fractimacula Warren, 1897
Pitthea fuliginosa Druce, 1910
Prasinocyma rugistrigula Prout, 1912
Problepsis similinotata Prout, 1917
Protosteira spectabilis (Warren, 1899)
Psilocerea pulverosa (Warren, 1894)
Psilocerea semirufa (Warren, 1901)
Psilocladia repudiosa (Prout, 1915)
Ptomophyle subcarnea (Warren, 1902)
Pycnostega areta Prout, 1934
Racotis angulosa Herbulot, 1973
Rhodophthitus tricoloraria (Mabille, 1890)
Scopula acidalia (Holland, 1894)
Scopula aphercta Prout, 1932
Scopula coniargyris Prout, 1932
Scopula internataria (Walker, 1861)
Scopula latitans Prout, 1920
Scopula luxipuncta Prout, 1932
Scopula pyraliata (Warren, 1898)
Scopula rectisecta Prout, 1920
Scopula stephanitis Prout, 1932
Scopula suda Prout, 1932
Somatina fungifera Warren, 1909
Somatina rhodochila Prout, 1932
Somatina virginalis Prout, 1917
Terina charmione (Fabricius, 1793)
Terina flaviorsa Prout, 1934
Terina octogesa (Druce, 1887)
Terina overlaeti Prout, 1932
Terina tanyeces Prout, 1921
Thalassodes dentatilinea Prout, 1912
Traminda neptunaria (Guenée, 1858)
Trimetopia aetheraria Guenée, 1858
Unnamed genus Ennominae ansorgeata (Warren, 1903)
Unnamed genus Ennominae sordida (Warren, 1905)
Vaena eacleoides Walker, 1869
Victoria perornata Warren, 1898
Xanthorhoe exorista Prout, 1922
Xanthorhoe procne (Fawcett, 1916)
Xanthorhoe transcissa (Warren, 1902)
Xanthorhoe transjugata Prout, 1923
Xanthorhoe trientata (Warren, 1901)
Xenimpia erosa Warren, 1895
Zamarada acosmeta Prout, 1921
Zamarada acrochra Prout, 1928
Zamarada adumbrata D. S. Fletcher, 1974
Zamarada aequilumata D. S. Fletcher, 1974
Zamarada amicta Prout, 1915
Zamarada amymone Prout, 1934
Zamarada antimima D. S. Fletcher, 1974
Zamarada arguta D. S. Fletcher, 1974
Zamarada astyphela D. S. Fletcher, 1974
Zamarada auratisquama Warren, 1897
Zamarada bastelbergeri Gaede, 1915
Zamarada bathyscaphes Prout, 1912
Zamarada bicuspida D. S. Fletcher, 1974
Zamarada bonaberiensis Strand, 1915
Zamarada candelabra D. S. Fletcher, 1974
Zamarada carcassoni D. S. Fletcher, 1974
Zamarada chrysopa D. S. Fletcher, 1974
Zamarada cinereata D. S. Fletcher, 1974
Zamarada clenchi D. S. Fletcher, 1974
Zamarada collarti Debauche, 1938
Zamarada consummata D. S. Fletcher, 1974
Zamarada corroborata Herbulot, 1954
Zamarada corymbophora D. S. Fletcher, 1974
Zamarada crystallophana Mabille, 1900
Zamarada cydippe Herbulot, 1954
Zamarada dasysceles D. S. Fletcher, 1974
Zamarada deformata D. S. Fletcher, 1974
Zamarada delta D. S. Fletcher, 1974
Zamarada dentata D. S. Fletcher, 1958
Zamarada denticatella Prout, 1922
Zamarada dentigera Warren, 1909
Zamarada dialitha D. S. Fletcher, 1974
Zamarada dilata D. S. Fletcher, 1974
Zamarada dione D. S. Fletcher, 1974
Zamarada dolorosa D. S. Fletcher, 1974
Zamarada dorsiplaga Prout, 1922
Zamarada dyscapna D. S. Fletcher, 1974
Zamarada enippe Prout, 1921
Zamarada episema D. S. Fletcher, 1974
Zamarada euerces Prout, 1928
Zamarada euphrosyne Oberthür, 1912
Zamarada euterpina Oberthür, 1912
Zamarada excavata Bethune-Baker, 1913
Zamarada exigua D. S. Fletcher, 1974
Zamarada fibulata D. S. Fletcher, 1974
Zamarada flavicaput Warren, 1901
Zamarada flavicosta Warren, 1897
Zamarada fumosa Gaede, 1915
Zamarada gamma D. S. Fletcher, 1958
Zamarada glareosa Bastelberger, 1909
Zamarada hero D. S. Fletcher, 1974
Zamarada ignicosta Prout, 1912
Zamarada incompta D. S. Fletcher, 1974
Zamarada ixiaria Swinhoe, 1904
Zamarada janata D. S. Fletcher, 1974
Zamarada kompsotes D. S. Fletcher, 1974
Zamarada labifera Prout, 1915
Zamarada latimargo Warren, 1897
Zamarada longidens D. S. Fletcher, 1963
Zamarada melanopyga Herbulot, 1954
Zamarada melpomene Oberthür, 1912
Zamarada metrioscaphes Prout, 1912
Zamarada mimesis D. S. Fletcher, 1974
Zamarada onycha D. S. Fletcher, 1974
Zamarada opala Carcasson, 1964
Zamarada ordinaria Bethune-Baker, 1913
Zamarada paxilla D. S. Fletcher, 1974
Zamarada pelobasis D. S. Fletcher, 1974
Zamarada penthesis D. S. Fletcher, 1974
Zamarada plana Bastelberger, 1909
Zamarada polyctemon Prout, 1932
Zamarada protrusa Warren, 1897
Zamarada psammites D. S. Fletcher, 1958
Zamarada purimargo Prout, 1912
Zamarada radula D. S. Fletcher, 1974
Zamarada reflexaria (Walker, 1863)
Zamarada rubrifascia Pinhey, 1962
Zamarada rufilinearia Swinhoe, 1904
Zamarada schalida D. S. Fletcher, 1974
Zamarada scintillans Bastelberger, 1909
Zamarada setosa D. S. Fletcher, 1974
Zamarada seydeli D. S. Fletcher, 1974
Zamarada sicula D. S. Fletcher, 1974
Zamarada similis D. S. Fletcher, 1974
Zamarada strigilecula D. S. Fletcher, 1974
Zamarada subinterrupta Gaede, 1915
Zamarada suda D. S. Fletcher, 1974
Zamarada terpsichore Oberthür, 1912
Zamarada thalia Oberthür, 1912
Zamarada tricuspida D. S. Fletcher, 1974
Zamarada unisona D. S. Fletcher, 1974
Zamarada variola D. S. Fletcher, 1974
Zamarada vigilans Prout, 1915
Zamarada volsella D. S. Fletcher, 1974
Zamarada vulpina Warren, 1897
Zeuctoboarmia bipandata (Prout, 1915)
Zeuctoboarmia contortilinea (Warren, 1897)
Zeuctoboarmia smithi (Warren, 1902)

Glyphipterigidae
Chrysocentris chalcotypa (Bradley, 1965)
Chrysocentris infuscata Ghesquière, 1940
Chrysocentris phaeometalla Meyrick, 1937

Gracillariidae
Acrocercops bifasciata (Walsingham, 1891)
Acrocercops cherimoliae Ghesquière, 1940
Caloptilia maynei Ghesquière, 1940
Caloptilia octopunctata (Turner, 1894)
Caloptilia ptychospora (Meyrick, 1938)
Cameraria landryi de Prins, 2012
Cameraria perodeaui de Prins, 2012
Cameraria zaira de Prins, 2012
Hyloconis luki de Prins, 2012
Neolithocolletis mayumbe de Prins, 2012
Neolithocolletis nsengai de Prins, 2012
Phyllocnistis cassiella Ghesquière, 1940
Phyllocnistis citrella Stainton, 1856
Phyllonorycter farensis De Prins & De Prins, 2007
Stomphastis thraustica (Meyrick, 1908)

Hepialidae
Eudalaca ammon (Wallengren, 1860)
Eudalaca holophaea (Hampson, 1910)
Gorgopis libania (Stoll, 1781)

Himantopteridae
Semioptila hedydipna Kiriakoff, 1954
Semioptila hyalina Talbot, 1926
Semioptila macrodipteryx Kiriakoff, 1954
Semioptila monochroma Hering, 1932
Semioptila psalidoprocne Kiriakoff, 1954
Semioptila stenopteryx Hering, 1932
Semioptila torta Butler, 1887

Hyblaeidae
Hyblaea fontainei Berio, 1967
Hyblaea occidentalium Holland, 1894

Immidae
Moca radiata (Walsingham, 1897)

Lasiocampidae
Anadiasa fuscofasciata (Aurivillius, 1922)
Beralade curvistriga Hering, 1929
Bombycopsis orthogramma Hering, 1932
Bombycopsis venosa (Butler, 1895)
Braura elgonensis (Kruck, 1940)
Braura ligniclusa (Walker, 1865)
Catalebeda tamsi Hering, 1932
Cheligium choerocampoides (Holland, 1893)
Cheligium nigrescens (Aurivillius, 1909)
Chrysopsyche imparilis Aurivillius, 1905
Chrysopsyche lamani Aurivillius, 1906
Cleopatrina phocea (Druce, 1887)
Epitrabala argyrostigma Hering, 1932
Eucraera koellikerii (Dewitz, 1881)
Eutricha morosa (Walker, 1865)
Euwallengrenia reducta (Walker, 1855)
Filiola dogma Zolotuhin & Gurkovich, 2009
Filiola fulgurata (Aurivillius, 1909)
Filiola lanceolata (Hering, 1932)
Filiola occidentale (Strand, 1912)
Gelo joannoui Zolotuhin & Prozorov, 2010
Gonopacha brotoessa (Holland, 1893)
Gonotrichidia modestissima Berio, 1937
Grellada enigmatica (Hering, 1941)
Grellada imitans (Aurivillius, 1893)
Grellada marshalli (Aurivillius, 1902)
Hypotrabala odonestioides Berio, 1937
Hypotrabala regalis Tams, 1953
Laeliopsis erythrura Aurivillius, 1914
Lechriolepis leopoldi Hering, 1929
Leipoxais batesi Bethune-Baker, 1927
Leipoxais dolichoprygma Tams, 1931
Leipoxais fuscofasciata Aurivillius, 1908
Leipoxais haematidea (Snellen, 1872)
Leipoxais ituria Bethune-Baker, 1909
Leipoxais lipophemisma Tams, 1929
Leipoxais marginepunctata Holland, 1893
Leipoxais noctis (Druce, 1910)
Leipoxais peraffinis Holland, 1893
Leipoxais rufobrunnea Strand, 1912
Leipoxais tolmera Tams, 1929
Mallocampa audea (Druce, 1887)
Mimopacha audeoudi Romieux, 1935
Mimopacha brunnea Hering, 1941
Mimopacha excavata Hering, 1935
Mimopacha similis Hering, 1935
Morongea arnoldi (Aurivillius, 1909)
Morongea avoniffi (Tams, 1929)
Morongea carnaria Zolotuhin & Prozorov, 2010
Morongea flavipicta (Tams, 1929)
Morongea lampara Zolotuhin & Prozorov, 2010
Morongea mastodont Zolotuhin & Prozorov, 2010
Muzunguja rectilineata (Aurivillius, 1900)
Napta lutunguru Dufrane, 1939
Nirbiana obscura (Hering, 1941)
Odontocheilopteryx dollmani Tams, 1930
Odontocheilopteryx gracifica Gurkovich & Zolotuhin, 2009
Odontocheilopteryx maculata Aurivillius, 1905
Odontocheilopteryx myxa Wallengren, 1860
Odontocheilopteryx pattersoni Tams, 1926
Odontocheilopteryx phoneus Hering, 1928
Odontocheilopteryx pica Gurkovich & Zolotuhin, 2009
Opisthodontia dannfelti Aurivillius, 1895
Opisthodontia supramalis Zolotuhin & Prozorov, 2010
Opisthoheza heza Zolotuhin & Prozorov, 2010
Pachymeta semifasciata Aurivillius
Pachymetana baldasseronii Berio, 1937
Pachymetana custodella Kiriakoff, 1965
Pachymetana guttata (Aurivillius, 1914)
Pachymetana horridula (Tams, 1925)
Pachyna satanas Zolotuhin & Gurkovich, 2009
Pachyna subfascia (Walker, 1855)
Pachypasa multipunctata (Hering, 1922)
Pachytrina crestalina Zolotuhin & Gurkovich, 2009
Pachytrina flamerchena Zolotuhin & Gurkovich, 2009
Pachytrina gliharta Zolotuhin & Gurkovich, 2009
Pachytrina honrathii (Dewitz, 1881)
Pachytrina papyroides (Tams, 1936)
Pachytrina philargyria (Hering, 1928)
Pachytrina rubra (Tams, 1929)
Pachytrina trihora Zolotuhin & Gurkovich, 2009
Pachytrina wenigina Zolotuhin & Gurkovich, 2009
Pallastica lateritia (Hering, 1928)
Pallastica litlura Zolotuhin & Gurukovich, 2009
Pallastica meloui (Riel, 1909)
Pallastica mesoleuca (Strand, 1911)
Pallastica pallens (Bethune-Baker, 1908)
Pallastica pyrsocoma (Tams, 1936)
Pallastica sericeofasciata (Aurivillius, 1921)
Philotherma fuscescens Hampson, 1910
Philotherma spargata (Holland, 1893)
Philotherma vulpecula Strand, 1918
Pseudolyra divisa Aurivillius, ????
Pseudolyra lineadentata (Bethune-Baker, 1911)
Pseudolyra major Hering, 1941
Pseudolyra megista Tams, 1931
Pseudolyra minima Hering, 1932
Pseudometa choba (Druce, 1899)
Pseudometa leonina Tams, 1929
Pseudometa nigricans Aurivillius, 1925
Pseudometa oinopa Tams, 1929
Ptyssophlebia avis Berio, 1937
Rhynchobombyx nasuta Aurivillius, 1908
Seydelora semna (Hering, 1941)
Sonitha alucard Zolotuhin & Prozorov, 2010
Sonitha bernardii Zolotuhin & Prozorov, 2010
Sonitha gelata Zolotuhin & Prozorov, 2010
Sonitha integra Zolotuhin & Prozorov, 2010
Sonitha libera (Aurivillius, 1914)
Sonitha lila Zolotuhin & Prozorov, 2010
Sonitha myoctona Zolotuhin & Prozorov, 2010
Sonitha picassoi Zolotuhin & Prozorov, 2010
Stenophatna hollandi (Tams, 1929)
Stenophatna kahli (Tams, 1929)
Stenophatna marshalli Aurivillius, 1909
Stenophatna rothschildi (Tams, 1936)
Stenophatna tamsi (Kiriakoff, 1963)
Stoermeriana cervina (Aurivillius, 1927)
Stoermeriana congoense (Aurivillius, 1908)
Stoermeriana craterum Tams, 1929
Stoermeriana distinguenda (Aurivillius, 1905)
Stoermeriana gamma (Aurivillius, 1908)
Stoermeriana graberi (Dewitz, 1881)
Stoermeriana oinopa (Tams, 1936)
Stoermeriana pachyla (Tams, 1936)
Stoermeriana pygmaeorum Tams, 1929
Streblote polydora (Druce, 1887)
Theophasida obusta (Tams, 1929)
Theophasida superba (Aurivillius, 1914)
Theophasida valkyria Zolotuhin & Prozorov, 2010
Trabala aethiopica (Strand, 1912)
Trabala charon Druce, 1910
Trabala prasinophena Tams, 1931
Trichopisthia igneotincta (Aurivillius, 1909)

Lemoniidae
Sabalia barnsi Prout, 1918
Sabalia tippelskirchi Karsch, 1898

Limacodidae
Afromiresa ustitermina (Hampson, 1910)
Altha basalis West, 1940
Apluda digramma Hering, 1929
Baria elsa (Druce, 1887)
Birthama saturata Kiriakoff, 1954
Brachia argyrogramma Karsch, 1896
Casphalia nigerrima Holland, 1893
Chrysamma purpuripulcra Karsch, 1896
Chrysopoloma albidiscalis Hampson, 1910
Chrysopoloma flavoantennata Berio, 1937
Chrysopoloma variegata Hering, 1937
Crothaema mormopis Meyrick, 1934
Crothaema ornata Romieux, 1934
Crothaema schoutedeni Hering, 1954
Crothaema trichromata West, 1937
Ctenolita anacompa Karsch, 1896
Ctenolita epargyra Karsch, 1896
Ctenolita melanosticta (Bethune-Baker, 1909)
Ctenolita tristis Hering, 1949
Delorhachis denisae Dufrane, 1945
Delorhachis mariae Dufrane, 1945
Delorhachis viridiplaga Karsch, 1896
Ectropa alberici Dufrane, 1945
Halseyia rufilinea (Bethune-Baker, 1909)
Halseyia seydeli (Hering, 1932)
Latoia joiceyi Tams, 1929
Latoia lutunguru Dufrane, 1945
Latoia neglecta Hering, 1928
Latoia vivida (Walker, 1865)
Macroplectra meridionalis Hering, 1928
Miresa basirufa Hering, 1941
Miresa livida West, 1940
Miresa semicalida Hampson, 1910
Narosa talboti Tams, 1929
Narosa trilinea Bethune-Baker, 1909
Niphadolepis bipunctata Hering, 1929
Niphadolepis luxurians Hering, 1928
Niphadolepis schultzei Hering, 1932
Niphadolepis viridissima Hering, 1829
Omocena songeana West, 1940
Omocena syrtis (Schaus & Clements, 1893)
Parasa carnapi Karsch, 1899
Parasa charopa Bethune-Baker, 1909
Parasa divisa West, 1940
Parasa lanceolata Hering, 1928
Phorma limbata Kiriakoff, 1954
Phorma subericolor Kiriakoff, 1954
Pseudomantria flava Bethune-Baker, 1911
Pseudomantria flavissima Hering, 1928
Scotinochroa mesepirotica Tams, 1929
Sporetolepis diachrysa Tams, 1929
Stroter intermissa (Walker, 1865)
Susica pyrocausta Hampson, 1910
Tetraphleba ruficeps (Hampson, 1909)

Lymantriidae
Aclonophlebia poecilanthes (Collenette, 1931)
Aroa achrodisca Hampson, 1910
Aroa callista (Collenette, 1933)
Aroa discalis Walker, 1855
Batella acronictoides (Collenette, 1937)
Batella katanga (Collenette, 1938)
Batella muscosa (Holland, 1893)
Batella parva Dall'Asta, 1981
Bracharoa mixta (Snellen, 1872)
Cropera phlebitis (Hampson, 1905)
Cropera sericea (Hampson, 1910)
Cropera seydeli (Hering, 1932)
Cropera stilpnaroma Hering, 1926
Cropera testacea Walker, 1855
Cropera xanthophaes Collenette, 1960
Crorema adspersa (Herrich-Schäffer, 1854)
Crorema desperata Hering, 1929
Crorema fuscinotata (Hampson, 1910)
Crorema mentiens Walker, 1855
Crorema ochracea (Snellen, 1872)
Crorema sandoa Collenette, 1936
Crorema staphylinochrous Hering, 1926
Crorema submaculata Collenette, 1931
Dasychira amydropa Collenette, 1960
Dasychira aphanes Collenette, 1938
Dasychira blastema Hering, 1926
Dasychira chlororhina Collenette, 1938
Dasychira chorista Hering, 1926
Dasychira dasynota Collenette, 1938
Dasychira gonophoroides Collenette, 1939
Dasychira hodoepora Collenette, 1960
Dasychira lulua Collenette, 1937
Dasychira melarhina Collenette, 1938
Dasychira pennatula (Fabricius, 1793)
Dasychira phaea Collenette, 1960
Dasychira punctifera (Walker, 1857)
Dasychira rhabdogonia Collenette, 1938
Dasychira soyensis Collenette, 1939
Dasychira statheuta (Collenette, 1937)
Dasychira stegmanni Grünberg, 1910
Decelleria brachycera (Collenette, 1937)
Dyasma thaumatopoeides (Schultze, 1934)
Eudasychira abellii Dall'Asta, 1983
Eudasychira bokuma (Collenette, 1960)
Eudasychira calliprepes (Collenette, 1933)
Eudasychira demoulini Dall'Asta, 1983
Eudasychira dina (Hering, 1926)
Eudasychira enigmatica Dall'Asta, 1983
Eudasychira errata Dall'Asta, 1983
Eudasychira eudela (Collenette, 1954)
Eudasychira gainsfordi Dall'Asta, 2009
Eudasychira georgiana (Fawcett, 1900)
Eudasychira nadinae Dall'Asta, 1983
Eudasychira sciodes (Collenette, 1960)
Eudasychira shabana Dall'Asta, 1983
Eudasychira subpolia Dall'Asta, 1983
Eudasychira tshuapana Dall'Asta, 1983
Eudasychira ultima Dall'Asta, 1983
Eudasychira unicolora Dall'Asta, 1983
Eudasychira vuattouxi Dall'Asta, 1983
Euproctis aethiopica Snellen, 1872
Euproctis aethodigmata Collenette, 1960
Euproctis alberici (Dufrane, 1942)
Euproctis apicipuncta (Holland, 1893)
Euproctis bigutta Holland, 1893
Euproctis butola Collenette, 1939
Euproctis cerealces Collenette, 1960
Euproctis conizona Collenette, 1933
Euproctis cratera Collenette, 1937
Euproctis cryphia Collenette, 1960
Euproctis dewitzi (Grünberg, 1907)
Euproctis falkensteini (Dewitz, 1881)
Euproctis fulvipennis Hampson, 1910
Euproctis mediosquamosa Bethune-Baker, 1909
Euproctis molunduana Aurivillius, 1925
Euproctis nessa Swinhoe, 1903
Euproctis nigrosquamosa Bethune-Baker, 1911
Euproctis palla (Holland, 1893)
Euproctis pallida (Kirby, 1896)
Euproctis panda Collenette, 1938
Euproctis producta (Walker, 1863)
Euproctis stenoptila Collenette, 1938
Euproctis utilis Swinhoe, 1903
Euproctoides acrisia Plötz, 1880
Euproctoides pavonacea (Romieux, 1934)
Griveaudyria ila (Swinhoe, 1904)
Hemerophanes libyra (Druce, 1896)
Heteronygmia strigitorna Hampson, 1910
Homochira rendalli (Distant, 1897)
Hyaloperina nudiuscula Aurivillius, 1904
Jacksoniana striata (Collenette, 1937)
Lacipa gemmata Distant, 1897
Lacipa jefferyi (Collenette, 1931)
Lacipa pulverea Distant, 1898
Lacipa quadripunctata Dewitz, 1881
Laelia bifascia Hampson, 1905
Laelia bonaberiensis (Strand, 1915)
Laelia diascia Hampson, 1905
Laelia dochmia Collenette, 1960
Laelia eutricha Collenette, 1931
Laelia extorta (Distant, 1897)
Laelia figlina Distant, 1899
Laelia fracta Schaus & Clements, 1893
Laelia gephyra (Hering, 1926)
Laelia gigantea Hampson, 1910
Laelia lusambo Collenette, 1960
Laelia phenax (Collenette, 1932)
Laelia pyrrhothrix Collenette, 1938
Laelia rogersi Bethune-Baker, 1913
Laelia siga Hering, 1926
Laelia subrosea (Walker, 1855)
Leptaroa fulvicolora Hampson, 1910
Leucoma dubia (Aurivillius, 1900)
Leucoma parva (Plötz, 1880)
Leucoma sericea (Berio, 1937)
Leucoperina atroguttata Aurivillius, 1909
Lomadonta callipepla Collenette, 1960
Lomadonta erythrina Holland, 1893
Lymantria multiscripta Holland, 1893
Lymantria vacillans Walker, 1855
Marblepsis flabellaria (Fabricius, 1787)
Mylantria xanthospila (Plötz, 1880)
Naroma nigrolunata Collenette, 1931
Naroma varipes (Walker, 1865)
Neomardara africana (Holland, 1893)
Olapa bipunctata (Holland, 1920)
Olapa fulviceps Hampson, 1910
Olapa makala Bethune-Baker, 1909
Olapa sakania (Berio, 1937)
Olapa tavetensis (Holland, 1892)
Orgyia hopkinsi Collenette, 1937
Otroeda hesperia (Cramer, 1779)
Otroeda nerina (Drury, 1780)
Otroeda papilionaria (Jordan, 1924)
Otroeda planax (Drury, 1780)
Otroeda vesperina Walker, 1854
Paqueta basilewskyi Dall'Asta, 1981
Paqueta brunneifascia Dall'Asta, 1981
Paqueta infima (Holland, 1893)
Paqueta sankuruensis Dall'Asta, 1981
Paqueta subchloroscia Dall'Asta, 1981
Parabatella polyploca (Collenette, 1960)
Paramarbla beni (Bethune-Baker, 1909)
Paramarbla catharia (Collenette, 1933)
Paramarbla diplosticta (Rebel, 1914)
Paramarbla hemileuca (Rebel, 1914)
Paramarbla nyctemerina (Rebel, 1914)
Pirga luteola Hering, 1926
Pirga mnemosyne Rebel, 1914
Porthesaroa lacipa Hering, 1926
Porthesaroa maculata Collenette, 1938
Porthesaroa noctua Hering, 1926
Psalis pennulata (Fabricius, 1793)
Pseudobazisa phaeophlebia (Hampson, 1910)
Pseudonotodonta virescens (Möschler, 1887)
Pteredoa plumosa Hampson, 1905
Rahona albimaculata Dall'Asta, 1981
Rahona bicornuta Dall'Asta, 1981
Rahona brunnea Dall'Asta, 1981
Rahona brunneicubitata Dall'Asta, 1981
Rahona caeruleibasalis Dall'Asta, 1981
Rahona collenettei Dall'Asta, 1981
Rahona hayesi Dall'Asta, 1981
Rahona hypnotoides (Collenette, 1957)
Rahona ladburyi (Bethune-Baker, 1911)
Rahona nigrofumata Dall'Asta, 1981
Rahona seitzi (Hering, 1926)
Rahona stauropa Dall'Asta, 1981
Rahona stauropoeides (Collenette, 1960)
Rahona subzairensis Dall'Asta, 1981
Rahona unica Dall'Asta, 1981
Rahona zairensis Dall'Asta, 1981
Rhypopteryx dracontea (Romieux, 1935)
Rhypopteryx fontainei Collenette, 1960
Rhypopteryx hemiphanta Collenette, 1955
Rhypopteryx minor (Collenette, 1938)
Rhypopteryx psoloconiama Collenette, 1960
Rhypopteryx psolozona (Collenette, 1938)
Rhypopteryx romieuxi (Collenette, 1938)
Rhypopteryx sordida Aurivillius, 1879
Rhypopteryx uele Collenette, 1960
Rhypopteryx xuthosticta (Collenette, 1938)
Sphragista kitchingi (Bethune-Baker, 1909)
Sphragista soloides Holland, 1920
Stracena bananae (Butler, 1897)
Stracena kamengo Collenette, 1936
Stracena promelaena (Holland, 1893)
Stracena striata Schultze, 1934
Stracilla ghesquierei Collenette, 1937
Stracilla translucida (Oberthür, 1880)
Tamsita ochthoeba (Hampson, 1920)
Viridichira brevistriata Dall'Asta, 1981
Viridichira cameruna (Aurivillius, 1904)
Viridichira longistriata (Hering, 1926)
Viridichira ochrorhabda (Collenette, 1937)
Viridichirana chlorophila (Hering, 1926)
Viridichirana decellei Dall'Asta, 1981

Metarbelidae
Haberlandia clenchi Lehmann, 2011
Haberlandia hulstaerti Lehmann, 2011
Haberlandia lusamboensis Lehmann, 2011
Haberlandia isakaensis Lehmann, 2011
Haberlandia isiroensis Lehmann, 2011
Haberlandia josephi Lehmann, 2011
Haberlandia rudolphi Lehmann, 2011
Haberlandia ueleensis Lehmann, 2011
Kroonia politzari Lehmann, 2010
Marshalliana latevittata Hering, 1949
Moyencharia winteri Lehmann, 2013
Paralebedella schultzei (Aurivillius, 1905)
Salagena denigrata Gaede, 1929
Salagena transversa Walker, 1865
Shimonia fischeri Lehmann & Rajaei, 2013
Shimonia oyiekeae Lehmann & Rajaei, 2013
Shimonia splendida (D. S. Fletcher, 1968)
Shimonia timberlakei Lehmann & Rajaei, 2013
Teragra orphnina Hering, 1932

Noctuidae
Abrostola congolensis Dufay, 1958
Abseudrapa metaphaearia (Walker, 1869)
Aburina electa Karsch, 1896
Aburina endoxantha Hampson, 1926
Acantholipes acephala Strand, 1912
Acantuerta ladina Jordan, 1926
Achaea albilimba Berio, 1954
Achaea basalis Berio, 1954
Achaea basilewskyi Berio, 1954
Achaea bergeri Berio, 1954
Achaea boris (Geyer, 1837)
Achaea catella Guenée, 1852
Achaea catocaloides Guenée, 1852
Achaea ezea (Cramer, 1779)
Achaea finita (Guenée, 1852)
Achaea fontainei Berio, 1956
Achaea illustrata Walker, 1858
Achaea leucopera Druce, 1912
Achaea lienardi (Boisduval, 1833)
Achaea macronephra (Berio, 1956)
Achaea mormoides Walker, 1858
Achaea rothkirchi (Strand, 1914)
Acontia aurelia Hacker, Legrain & Fibiger, 2008
Acontia callima Bethune-Baker, 1911
Acontia chrysoproctis (Hampson, 1902)
Acontia citrelinea Bethune-Baker, 1911
Acontia discoidea Hopffer, 1857
Acontia metaxantha (Hampson, 1910)
Acontia nephele Hampson, 1911
Acontia niphogona (Hampson, 1909)
Acontia obliqua Hacker, Legrain & Fibiger, 2010
Acontia secta Guenée, 1852
Acontia transfigurata Wallengren, 1856
Acontia wahlbergi Wallengren, 1856
Acrapex brunnea Hampson, 1910
Acrapex holoscota Hampson, 1914
Acrapex rhabdoneura Hampson, 1910
Acrapex spoliata (Walker, 1863)
Acrapex unicolora (Hampson, 1910)
Aegocera fervida (Walker, 1854)
Aegocera geometrica Hampson, 1910
Aegocera jordani Kiriakoff, 1955
Aegocera obliqua Mabille, 1893
Aegocera rectilinea Boisduval, 1836
Aegocera tigrina (Druce, 1882)
Aegocera tricolora Bethune-Baker, 1909
Agoma trimenii (Felder, 1874)
Agrotis isopleura Hampson, 1902
Aletia laevusta (Berio, 1955)
Amazonides invertita Berio, 1962
Amyna axis Guenée, 1852
Amyna griseola (Snellen, 1872)
Andrhippuris caudaequina Karsch, 1895
Anedhella stigmata (Janse, 1938)
Anomis auragoides (Guenée, 1852)
Anomis bidentata (Hampson, 1910)
Anomis elegans Berio, 1956
Anomis melanosema Berio, 1956
Anomis modesta Berio, 1956
Anomis subfuscata Berio, 1956
Apaegocera aurantipennis Hampson, 1912
Asota chionea (Mabille, 1878)
Asota concinnula (Mabille, 1878)
Aspidifrontia anomala Berio, 1955
Aspidifrontia cinerea Berio, 1966
Aspidifrontia contrastata A. E. Prout, 1921
Aspidifrontia glaucescens Hampson, 1905
Aspidifrontia semipallida Hampson, 1902
Athetis atristicta Hampson, 1918
Athetis heliastis Hampson, 1909
Athetis melanosticta Hampson, 1909
Athetis satellitia (Hampson, 1902)
Attatha ethiopica Hampson, 1910
Avitta ceromacra Berio, 1956
Brephos nyassana (Bartel, 1903)
Brephos straeleniana (Kiriakoff, 1954)
Busseola fusca (Fuller, 1901)
Caligatus angasii Wing, 1850
Calliodes pretiosissima Holland, 1892
Callophisma flavicornis Hampson, 1913
Callopistria latreillei (Duponchel, 1827)
Carpostalagma chalybeata Talbot, 1929
Carpostalagma viridis (Plötz, 1880)
Caryonopera bergeri Berio, 1956
Cerocala basilewskyi Berio, 1954
Cerocala mindingiensis Romieux, 1937
Cerynea thermesialis (Walker, 1866)
Chaetostephana rendalli (Rothschild, 1896)
Charitosemia geraldi (Kirby, 1896)
Choeropais jucunda (Jordan, 1904)
Chrysodeixis acuta (Walker, [1858])
Compsotata janmoullei (Kiriakoff, 1954)
Condica capensis (Guenée, 1852)
Condica conducta (Walker, 1857)
Conservula cinisigna de Joannis, 1906
Crameria amabilis (Drury, 1773)
Ctenoplusia fracta (Walker, 1857)
Ctenusa pallida (Hampson, 1902)
Cucullia katangae Romieux, 1943
Cyligramma fluctuosa (Drury, 1773)
Cyligramma latona (Cramer, 1775)
Cyligramma limacina (Guérin-Méneville, 1832)
Cyligramma magus (Guérin-Méneville, [1844])
Devena strigania Hampson, 1926
Dicerogastra proleuca (Hampson, 1913)
Digama meridionalis Swinhoe, 1907
Digama pandaensis Romieux, 1935
Diomea disticta Bethune-Baker, 1909
Dysgonia algira (Linnaeus, 1767)
Dysgonia goniophora (Hampson, 1910)
Dysgonia irregulata Berio, 1956
Dysgonia palpalis (Walker, 1865)
Dysgonia properans (Walker, 1858)
Dysgonia proxima (Hampson, 1902)
Dysgonia torrida (Guenée, 1852)
Effractilis effracta (Distant, 1898)
Egnasia apicata Berio, 1956
Egnasia dimorfica Berio, 1956
Egnasia hypomochla D. S. Fletcher, 1963
Egnasia mimetica Berio, 1956
Egybolis vaillantina (Stoll, 1790)
Entomogramma pardus Guenée, 1852
Erebus macrops (Linnaeus, 1767)
Erebus walkeri (Butler, 1875)
Ethiopica polyastra Hampson, 1909
Ethiopica subpurpurea Kiriakoff, 1954
Eublemma almaviva Berio, 1947
Eublemma anachoresis (Wallengren, 1863)
Eublemma decora (Walker, 1869)
Eublemma exigua (Walker, 1858)
Eublemma heterogramma (Mabille, 1881)
Eublemma orthogramma (Snellen, 1872)
Eublemma scitula (Rambur, 1833)
Eudocima divitiosa (Walker, 1869)
Eudocima fullonia (Clerck, 1764)
Eudocima materna (Linnaeus, 1767)
Eudrapa fontainei Berio, 1956
Eudrapa maculata Berio, 1956
Eudrapa mollis Walker, 1857
Euheterospila antennalis Strand, 1912
Euippodes diversa Berio, 1956
Euippodes euprepes Hampson, 1926
Euippodes perundulata Berio, 1956
Eustrotia micropis Hampson, 1910
Eutelia gabriela Hampson, 1912
Eutelia quadriliturata Walker, 1869
Eutelia symphonica Hampson, 1902
Feliniopsis africana (Schaus & Clements, 1893)
Feliniopsis connivens (Felder & Rogenhofer, 1874)
Feliniopsis duponti (Laporte, 1974)
Feliniopsis grisea (Laporte, 1973)
Feliniopsis gueneei (Laporte, 1973)
Feliniopsis hosplitoides (Laporte, 1979)
Feliniopsis laportei Hacker & Fibiger, 2007
Feliniopsis nigribarbata (Hampson, 1908)
Feliniopsis satellitis (Berio, 1974)
Feliniopsis thoracica (Walker, 1858)
Gesonia obeditalis Walker, 1859
Gesonia stictigramma Hampson, 1926
Giria pectinicornis (Bethune-Baker, 1909)
Godasa sidae (Fabricius, 1793)
Gracilodes finissima Berio, 1956
Grammodes congenita Walker, 1858
Grammodes geometrica (Fabricius, 1775)
Grammodes stolida (Fabricius, 1775)
Helicoverpa armigera (Hübner, [1808])
Heliophisma klugii (Boisduval, 1833)
Heraclia aemulatrix (Westwood, 1881)
Heraclia aurantiaca Kiriakoff, 1975
Heraclia buchholzi (Plötz, 1880)
Heraclia butleri (Walker, 1869)
Heraclia flavipennis (Bartel, 1903)
Heraclia geryon (Fabricius, 1781)
Heraclia gruenbergi (Wichgraf, 1911)
Heraclia hornimani (Druce, 1880)
Heraclia hypercompoides (Butler, 1895)
Heraclia jugans (Jordan, 1913)
Heraclia karschi (Holland, 1897)
Heraclia kivuensis Kiriakoff, 1973
Heraclia longipennis (Walker, 1854)
Heraclia medeba (Druce, 1880)
Heraclia monslunensis (Hampson, 1901)
Heraclia nobela Kiriakoff, 1974
Heraclia pallida (Walker, 1854)
Heraclia pampata Kiriakoff, 1974
Heraclia pardalina (Walker, 1869)
Heraclia poggei (Dewitz, 1879)
Heraclia superba (Butler, 1875)
Heraclia zenkeri (Karsch, 1895)
Hespagarista caudata (Dewitz, 1879)
Hespagarista eburnea Jordan, 1915
Hypena laetalis Walker, 1859
Hypena leucosticta Bethune-Baker, 1909
Hypena poliopera Bethune-Baker, 1909
Hypena semilutea (Snellen, 1872)
Hypena senialis Guenée, 1854
Hypocala deflorata (Fabricius, 1794)
Hypoplexia algoa (Felder & Rogenhofer, 1874)
Hypopyra allardi (Oberthür, 1878)
Hypopyra capensis Herrich-Schäffer, 1854
Hypotuerta transiens (Hampson, 1901)
Isadelphina mariaeclarae Kiriakoff, 1954
Leucania brantsii Snellen, 1872
Leucania insulicola Guenée, 1852
Leucania phaea Hampson, 1902
Leucania prominens (Walker, 1856)
Leucania rhabdophora Hampson, 1902
Leucania tacuna Felder & Rogenhofer, 1874
Leucovis alba (Rothschild, 1897)
Libystica woerdenialis (Snellen, 1872)
Lithacodia blandula (Guenée, 1862)
Lophoptera methyalea (Hampson, 1902)
Manga melanodonta (Hampson, 1910)
Marcipa accentifera Pelletier, 1975
Marcipa acutangula Pelletier, 1975
Marcipa aequatorialis Pelletier, 1975
Marcipa bergeri Pelletier, 1975
Marcipa kirdii Pelletier, 1975
Marcipa mariaeclarae Pelletier, 1975
Marcipalina berioi (Pelletier, 1975)
Marcipalina hayesi (Pelletier, 1975)
Marcipalina laportei (Pelletier, 1975)
Masalia bimaculata (Moore, 1888)
Masalia cheesmanae Seymour, 1972
Masalia flavistrigata (Hampson, 1903)
Masalia funebris (Berio, 1962)
Masalia galatheae (Wallengren, 1856)
Masalia leucosticta (Hampson, 1902)
Masalia sublimis (Berio, 1962)
Masalia transvaalica (Distant, 1902)
Massaga hesparia (Cramer, 1775)
Massaga maritona Butler, 1868
Massaga monteirona Butler, 1874
Massaga tenuifascia (Hampson, 1910)
Matopo tamsi Kiriakoff, 1954
Maxera lophocera (Hampson, 1910)
Mazuca amoena Jordan, 1933
Mazuca strigicincta Walker, 1866
Melanephia trista (Snellen, 1872)
Mentaxya albifrons (Geyer, 1837)
Mentaxya basilewskyi (Berio, 1955)
Mentaxya bergeri (Berio, 1955)
Mentaxya ignicollis (Walker, 1857)
Mentaxya leroyi (Berio, 1955)
Mentaxya percurvata (Berio, 1955)
Metagarista maenas (Herrich-Schäffer, 1853)
Metagarista triphaenoides Walker, 1854
Micragrotis interstriata (Hampson, 1902)
Micraxylia distalis Berio, 1962
Micraxylia transfixa Berio, 1963
Micraxylia varians Berio, 1972
Midea pruinosa (Snellen, 1872)
Miniodes discolor Guenée, 1852
Misa cosmetica Karsch, 1898
Mitrophrys barnsi Joicey & Talbot, 1921
Mitrophrys gynandra Jordan, 1913
Mitrophrys menete (Cramer, 1775)
Mocis conveniens (Walker, 1858)
Mocis frugalis (Fabricius, 1775)
Mocis mayeri (Boisduval, 1833)
Mocis mutuaria (Walker, 1858)
Mocis persinuosa (Hampson, 1910)
Mocis repanda (Fabricius, 1794)
Mocis undata (Fabricius, 1775)
Naarda tandoana (Bethune-Baker, 1911)
Neostichtis nigricostata (Hampson, 1908)
Nodaria melaleuca Hampson, 1902
Nyodes brevicornis (Walker, 1857)
Odontodes aleuca Guenée, 1852
Ogovia pudens (Holland, 1894)
Ogovia tavetensis Holland, 1892
Omphaloceps triangularis (Mabille, 1893)
Ophiusa gonoptera Hampson, 1910
Ophiusa inangulata (Gaede, 1917)
Ophiusa mejanesi (Guenée, 1852)
Ophiusa mimetica (Berio, 1954)
Ophiusa overlaeti Berio, 1956
Ophiusa pseudotirhaca (Berio, 1956)
Ophiusa rogata (Berio, 1954)
Ophiusa tettensis (Hopffer, 1857)
Ophiusa xylochroa (Druce, 1912)
Oraesia cerne (Fawcett, 1916)
Oruza latifera (Walker, 1869)
Ozarba africana Berio, 1940
Ozarba chryseiplaga Hampson, 1910
Ozarba hemichrysea Hampson, 1910
Ozarba phaeocroa Hampson, 1910
Pandesma muricolor Berio, 1966
Pangrapta dulcis Berio, 1956
Pangrapta laevis Berio, 1956
Parachalciope benitensis (Holland, 1894)
Parachalciope emiplaneta Berio, 1954
Parachalciope euclidicola (Walker, 1858)
Parasoloe tetrasticta Kiriakoff, 1954
Paratuerta undulata Berio, 1970
Pericyma mendax (Walker, 1858)
Pericyma polygramma Hampson, 1913
Phaegorista prouti Joicey & Talbot, 1921
Phaegorista similis Walker, 1869
Phlogochroa basilewskyi Berio, 1956
Phlogochroa fontainei Berio, 1956
Phlogochroa pyrochroa (Bethune-Baker, 1909)
Phytometra africana (Snellen, 1872)
Phytometra nigrogemmea Romieux, 1943
Plecoptera androconiata Hampson, 1926
Plecoptera melanoscia Hampson, 1926
Polydesma collusoria (Berio, 1954)
Polydesma umbricola Boisduval, 1833
Pseudoarcte melanis (Mabille, 1890)
Pseudogiria angulata (Bethune-Baker, 1909)
Pseudospiris paidiformis Butler, 1895
Pseudotuerta argyrochlora (Carcasson, 1964)
Radara subcupralis (Walker, [1866])
Ramesodes divisa (Hampson, 1902)
Rhanidophora aethiops (Grünberg, 1907)
Rhanidophora ridens Hampson, 1902
Rhanidophora septipunctata Bethune-Baker, 1909
Rivula invertita (Berio, 1956)
Sarmatia indenta Bethune-Baker, 1909
Sarothroceras banaka (Plötz, 1880)
Schausia dambuza Kiriakoff, 1975
Schausia gladiatoria (Holland, 1893)
Schausia leona (Schaus, 1893)
Schausia mantatisi Kiriakoff, 1975
Sciatta debeauxi (Berio, 1937)
Sciomesa scotochroa (Hampson, 1914)
Sesamia albivena Hampson, 1902
Sesamia tosta Snellen, 1872
Simplicia inflexalis Guenée, 1854
Soloe trigutta Walker, 1854
Soloella guttivaga (Walker, 1854)
Sphingomorpha chlorea (Cramer, 1777)
Spirama glaucescens (Butler, 1893)
Spodoptera littoralis (Boisduval, 1833)
Stictoptera conturbata (Walker, 1869)
Stilbotis babaulti Laporte, 1984
Stilbotis isopleuroides Berio, 1967
Stilbotis nigra Berio, 1963
Stilbotis rubra (Berio, 1977)
Sypnoides flandriana (Berio, 1954)
Tachosa acronyctoides Walker, 1869
Tathorhynchus plumbea (Distant, 1898)
Tavia polycyma Hampson, 1926
Thiacidas acronictoides (Berio, 1950)
Thiacidas mukim (Berio, 1977)
Thyas androgyna (Berio, 1954)
Thyas parallelipipeda (Guenée, 1852)
Thyas rubricata (Holland, 1894)
Thysanoplusia cupreomicans (Hampson, 1909)
Thysanoplusia indicator (Walker, [1858])
Tolna alboapicata Berio, 1956
Tolna chionopera (Druce, 1912)
Tolna versicolor Walker, 1869
Tolnaopsis eusciasta Hampson, 1926
Tracheplexia conservuloides Berio, 1966
Trichopalpina simplex Berio, 1956
Trichopalpina zethesia Hampson, 1926
Trichoplusia gorilla (Holland, 1894)
Trichoplusia spoliata (Walker, 1858)
Trigonodes hyppasia (Cramer, 1779)
Tuerta chrysochlora Walker, 1869
Tycomarptes inferior (Guenée, 1852)
Vietteania torrentium (Guenée, 1852)
Wolframmeyia imperialis (Grünberg, 1910)
Xoria orthogramma (Bethune-Baker, 1909)
Yidalpta selenialis (Snellen, 1872)

Nolidae
Blenina chrysochlora (Walker, 1865)
Bryophilopsis hamula (Snellen, 1872)
Characoma sexilinea (Bethune-Baker, 1909)
Earias biplaga Walker, 1866
Eligma bettiana Prout, 1923
Eligma hypsoides (Walker, 1869)
Hypodeva superba (Druce, 1911)
Maurilia arcuata (Walker, [1858])
Metaleptina nigribasis Holland, 1893
Negeta luminosa (Walker, 1858)
Negeta ochreoplaga (Bethune-Baker, 1909)
Nola chia (Holland, 1894)
Nola omphalota (Hampson, 1903)
Odontestis mesonephele (Bethune-Baker, 1909)
Ophiosema jansei Romieux, 1943
Petrinia lignosa Walker, 1869

Notodontidae
Achaera ochribasis (Hampson, 1910)
Acrasiella hypochlora (Kiriakoff, 1960)
Afrocerura cameroona (Bethune-Baker, 1927)
Afrocerura leonensis (Hampson, 1910)
Afroplitis bergeri (Viette, 1954)
Afroplitis dasychirina (Gaede, 1928)
Afropydna distincta Kiriakoff, 1961
Afropydna indistincta (Gaede, 1928)
Afropydna witteana (Kiriakoff, 1954)
Amphiphalera leuconephra Hampson, 1910
Anaphe etiennei Schouteden, 1912
Anaphe panda (Boisduval, 1847)
Anaphe perobscura Berio, 1937
Anaphe subsordida Butler, 1893
Anaphe venata Butler, 1878
Anciera postalba Kiriakoff, 1962
Anciera roseiventris Kiriakoff, 1962
Andocidia tabernaria Kiriakoff, 1958
Antheua croceipuncta Hampson, 1910
Antheua delicata Bethune-Baker, 1911
Antheua dimorpha Janse, 1920
Antheua elongata Gaede, 1928
Antheua encausta (Hampson, 1910)
Antheua gallans (Karsch, 1895)
Antheua ornata (Walker, 1865)
Antheua rufovittata (Aurivillius, 1901)
Antheua simplex Walker, 1855
Antheua tricolor Walker, 1855
Antheua trifasciata (Hampson, 1909)
Antheua trimacula Kiriakoff, 1954
Antheua woerdeni (Snellen, 1872)
Aoba tosta Kiriakoff, 1965
Aprosdocetos inexpectata (Rothschild, 1917)
Archinadata aurivilliusi (Kiriakoff, 1954)
Archistilbia cineracea Kiriakoff, 1954
Archistilbia ochracea Kiriakoff, 1962
Arciera grisea (Holland, 1893)
Arciera lanuginosa (Rothschild, 1917)
Arciera phragmatoecioides (Rothschild, 1917)
Astaura umbrosa Kiriakoff, 1964
Atrasana basistriga Kiriakoff, 1960
Atrasana centralis Kiriakoff, 1960
Atrasana grisea (Gaede, 1928)
Atrasana lignea Kiriakoff, 1965
Baliopteryx aeruginosa (Gaede, 1928)
Baliopteryx argyrophora (Hampson, 1910)
Batempa plana Kiriakoff, 1962
Bilulua atricollis Kiriakoff, 1954
Bilulua strigata Kiriakoff, 1954
Bisolita brunneifascia (Hampson, 1910)
Bisolita interna (Kiriakoff, 1961)
Bisolita strigata (Aurivillius, 1906)
Boscawenia incerta (Schultze, 1934)
Boscawenia jaspidea (Schultze, 1934)
Bostrychogyna argenteopicta Kiriakoff, 1960
Bostrychogyna bella (Bethune-Baker, 1913)
Bostrychogyna oneida Kiriakoff, 1964
Brachychira argentina Kiriakoff, 1955
Brachychira argyrosticta Kiriakoff, 1954
Brachychira dives Kiriakoff, 1960
Brachychira dormitans Berio, 1937
Brachychira excellens (Rothschild, 1917)
Brachychira ligata Kiriakoff, 1955
Brachychira lununigera Kiriakoff, 1954
Brachychira numenius Kiriakoff, 1955
Brachychira pretiosa Kiriakoff, 1962
Brachychira subargentea Kiriakoff, 1955
Catarctia eos (Kiriakoff, 1955)
Cerurina marshalli (Hampson, 1910)
Chlorocalliope calliope (Hampson, 1910)
Chlorocalliope margarethae Kiriakoff, 1958
Chlorochadisra beltista (Tams, 1930)
Chlorochadisra umbra (Kiriakoff, 1954)
Clostera leloupi (Kiriakoff, 1954)
Clostera ochracearia Kiriakoff, 1954
Crestonica circulosa (Gaede, 1928)
Daulopaectes trichosa (Hampson, 1910)
Deinarchia agramma (Hampson, 1910)
Deriddera margarethae Kiriakoff, 1955
Desmeocraera albicans Gaede, 1928
Desmeocraera analis Kiriakoff, 1954
Desmeocraera annulosa Gaede, 1928
Desmeocraera basalis Distant, 1899
Desmeocraera brumata Kiriakoff, 1964
Desmeocraera brunneicosta Gaede, 1928
Desmeocraera chloeropsis (Holland, 1893)
Desmeocraera clenchi Kiriakoff, 1958
Desmeocraera collenettei Kiriakoff, 1954
Desmeocraera congoana Aurivillius, 1900
Desmeocraera decorata (Wichgraf, 1922)
Desmeocraera dispar Kiriakoff, 1964
Desmeocraera esmeraldina Kiriakoff, 1958
Desmeocraera falsa (Holland, 1893)
Desmeocraera formosa Kiriakoff, 1958
Desmeocraera frustrata Kiriakoff, 1964
Desmeocraera galaia Kiriakoff, 1965
Desmeocraera geminata Gaede, 1928
Desmeocraera glauca Gaede, 1928
Desmeocraera hebe Kiriakoff, 1964
Desmeocraera helena Kiriakoff, 1962
Desmeocraera holitrix Kiriakoff, 1958
Desmeocraera ingens Kiriakoff, 1958
Desmeocraera inquisitrix Kiriakoff, 1958
Desmeocraera inspiciens Kiriakoff, 1962
Desmeocraera interpellatrix (Wallengren, 1860)
Desmeocraera intricata Kiriakoff, 1964
Desmeocraera invaria Kiriakoff, 1958
Desmeocraera irregularis Kiriakoff, 1960
Desmeocraera latex (Druce, 1901)
Desmeocraera latifasciata Gaede, 1928
Desmeocraera leucosticta (Hampson, 1910)
Desmeocraera octoginta (Hampson, 1910)
Desmeocraera pallidimargo Kiriakoff, 1962
Desmeocraera pauliveronensis Kiriakoff, 1958
Desmeocraera percontatrix Kiriakoff, 1958
Desmeocraera phoebe Kiriakoff, 1964
Desmeocraera postulatrix Kiriakoff, 1958
Desmeocraera principalis Kiriakoff, 1958
Desmeocraera procreatrix Kiriakoff, 1962
Desmeocraera propinqua (Holland, 1893)
Desmeocraera psittacina Kiriakoff, 1964
Desmeocraera reclamatrix Kiriakoff, 1958
Desmeocraera retiarius Kiriakoff, 1958
Desmeocraera rogatrix Kiriakoff, 1958
Desmeocraera sagittata Gaede, 1928
Desmeocraera squamipennis (Holland, 1893)
Desmeocraera subvaria Kiriakoff, 1958
Desmeocraera varia (Walker, 1855)
Desmeocraera venusta Kiriakoff, 1954
Desmeocraera weberiana Kiriakoff, 1958
Desmeocraerula basimacula Kiriakoff, 1954
Desmeocraerula inconspicuana Strand, 1912
Desmeocraerula senicula Kiriakoff, 1963
Desmeocraerula viridipicta Kiriakoff, 1963
Diopeithes barnesi Kiriakoff, 1958
Disracha synceros Kiriakoff, 1962
Drapetides uniformis (Swinhoe, 1907)
Elaphrodes duplex (Gaede, 1928)
Elaphrodes lactea (Gaede, 1932)
Elaphrodes nephocrossa Bethune-Baker, 1909
Enomotarcha adversa (Karsch, 1895)
Enomotarcha apicalis (Aurivillius, 1925)
Enomotarcha chloana (Holland, 1893)
Enomotarcha heterochroma Kiriakoff, 1958
Enomotarcha vulcanica Kiriakoff, 1958
Epanaphe bergeri Kiriakoff, 1970
Epanaphe candezei (Hulstaert, 1924)
Epanaphe carteri (Walsingham, 1885)
Epanaphe clarilla Aurivillius, 1904
Epanaphe maynei (Hulstaert, 1924)
Epanaphe moloneyi (Druce, 1887)
Epanaphe nigricincta (Hulstaert, 1924)
Epanaphe parva (Aurivillius, 1891)
Epanaphe unifasciata (Hulstaert, 1924)
Epanaphe vuilleti (de Joannis, 1907)
Epicerura bivittata (Kiriakoff, 1954)
Epicerura pergrisea (Hampson, 1910)
Epicerura steniptera (Hampson, 1910)
Epidonta brunneomixta (Mabille, 1897)
Epidonta decipiens (Kiriakoff, 1960)
Epidonta hulstaerti Kiriakoff, 1962
Epidonta inconspicua Kiriakoff, 1962
Epidonta punctata Kiriakoff, 1962
Epidonta transversa (Gaede, 1928)
Epimetula albipuncta (Gaede, 1928)
Epimetula melina Kiriakoff, 1964
Epimetula stipatrix (Kiriakoff, 1962)
Epitrotonotus vilis (Holland, 1893)
Eurystaura brunnea Janse, 1920
Eurystaura erecta Gaede, 1928
Eurystaura flava Gaede, 1928
Eurystaurella subaequa Kiriakoff, 1962
Eurystauridia fusconebulosa (Kiriakoff, 1962)
Eurystauridia olivacea (Gaede, 1928)
Eurystauridia pinto (Kiriakoff, 1962)
Eutimia marpissa Wallengren, 1858
Fentonina schoutedeni Viette, 1954
Gaedeina alternata (Romieux, 1943)
Gaedeina romieuxi (Kiriakoff, 1960)
Galona serena Karsch, 1895
Gargettina longivitta (Kiriakoff, 1962)
Heraia thalassina (Hampson, 1910)
Iphigeniella prasina Kiriakoff, 1962
Janthinisca flavescens Kiriakoff, 1960
Janthinisca flavipennis (Hampson, 1910)
Janthinisca lilacea Kiriakoff, 1959
Liriochroa divergens (Kiriakoff, 1954)
Lomela pudica Kiriakoff, 1962
Lopiena indecora (Kiriakoff, 1949)
Lopiena ochracea (Bethune-Baker, 1911)
Macronadata inculta Kiriakoff, 1964
Macrosenta longicauda Holland, 1893
Macrosenta rosella Kiriakoff, 1964
Macrosenta undulata Kiriakoff, 1965
Mesonadata quinquemaculata Kiriakoff, 1960
Metopolophota epinephela Bethune-Baker, 1909
Metopteryx atribasalis (Kiriakoff, 1964)
Microchadisra angustipennis Kiriakoff, 1960
Notoxantha sesamiodes Hampson, 1910
Odontoperas archonta Kiriakoff, 1959
Odontoperas bergeri Kiriakoff, 1969
Odontoperas caecimacula Kiriakoff, 1962
Odontoperas fontainei Kiriakoff, 1960
Odontoperas luteimacula Kiriakoff, 1964
Odontoperas rubricosta Kiriakoff, 1959
Omocerina orientalis (Kiriakoff, 1954)
Oreocerura dissodectes (Kiriakoff, 1958)
Otpada recussa Kiriakoff, 1965
Paradiastema nigrocincta Aurivillius, 1901
Paradrallia punctigera Hulstaert, 1924
Paradrallia rhodesi Bethune-Baker, 1908
Pararhenea viridescens Kiriakoff, 1960
Parastaura divisa Gaede, 1928
Parastaura mediobrunnea Kiriakoff, 1962
Paulisana rufina Kiriakoff, 1960
Peratodonta brunnea Aurivillius, 1904
Peratodonta extensa Gaede, 1928
Peratodonta olivaceorosea Kiriakoff, 1962
Phalera atrata (Grünberg, 1907)
Phalera imitata Druce, 1896
Phalera lydenburgi Distant, 1899
Pittheides chloauchena (Holland, 1893)
Psalisodes concolora (Bethune-Baker, 1909)
Pseudobarobata angulata Gaede, 1928
Pseudorethona albicans (Walker, 1855)
Ptilura argyraspis Holland, 1893
Pycnographa netrioides Kiriakoff, 1962
Pycnographa tamarix Kiriakoff, 1958
Pygaerina mediopurpurea Kiriakoff, 1960
Pygaerina radiata Kiriakoff, 1965
Rhenea rufescens Kiriakoff, 1954
Rosinella rosinaria (Hampson, 1910)
Scalmicauda alboterminalis Kiriakoff, 1962
Scalmicauda aliena Kiriakoff, 1962
Scalmicauda confusa Kiriakoff, 1959
Scalmicauda costalis Kiriakoff, 1965
Scalmicauda curvilinea Kiriakoff, 1959
Scalmicauda decorata Kiriakoff, 1962
Scalmicauda ectomelinos Kiriakoff, 1962
Scalmicauda geometrica Kiriakoff, 1969
Scalmicauda ignicolor Kiriakoff, 1964
Scalmicauda molestula Kiriakoff, 1959
Scalmicauda obliterata Kiriakoff, 1962
Scalmicauda obscurior Gaede, 1928
Scalmicauda oreas Kiriakoff, 1958
Scalmicauda orthogramma Kiriakoff, 1960
Scalmicauda ovalis Kiriakoff, 1965
Scalmicauda paucinotata Kiriakoff, 1959
Scalmicauda remmia Kiriakoff, 1959
Scalmicauda subfusca Kiriakoff, 1959
Scalmicauda uniarcuata Kiriakoff, 1962
Scalmicauda uniarculinea Kiriakoff, 1965
Scalmicauda venustissima Kiriakoff, 1969
Scalmicauda vulpinaria Kiriakoff, 1965
Scarnica albonotata Kiriakoff, 1962
Scrancia agrostes Kiriakoff, 1962
Scrancia angustissima Kiriakoff, 1962
Scrancia argyrochroa Kiriakoff, 1962
Scrancia atrifasciata Gaede, 1928
Scrancia corticalis Kiriakoff, 1965
Scrancia erythrops Kiriakoff, 1962
Scrancia expleta Kiriakoff, 1962
Scrancia galactopera Kiriakoff, 1962
Scrancia leucopera Hampson, 1910
Scrancia leucosparsa Kiriakoff, 1964
Scrancia margaritacea Gaede, 1928
Scrancia melierax Kiriakoff, 1965
Scrancia modesta Holland, 1893
Scrancia oculata Kiriakoff, 1962
Scrancia paucinotata Kiriakoff, 1962
Scrancia piperita Kiriakoff, 1962
Scrancia polyphemus Kiriakoff, 1962
Scrancia pyralina Kiriakoff, 1964
Scrancia rachitica Kiriakoff, 1962
Scrancia vaga Kiriakoff, 1962
Scranciola brunneidorsa Kiriakoff, 1964
Scranciola livida Kiriakoff, 1962
Scranciola lunula Kiriakoff, 1964
Scranciola quadripunctata Gaede, 1928
Scranciola roseimacula Kiriakoff, 1962
Scranciola rufula (Hampson, 1910)
Scranciola straminea Kiriakoff, 1962
Scranciola unisignata Kiriakoff, 1962
Sidisca hypochloe Kiriakoff, 1958
Stauropussa chloe (Holland, 1893)
Stenostauridia postdiscalis Kiriakoff, 1964
Subscrancia nigra (Aurivillius, 1904)
Synete albipunctella Kiriakoff, 1959
Synete anna Kiriakoff, 1964
Synete dirki Kiriakoff, 1959
Synete helgae Kiriakoff, 1959
Synete vaumaculata Kiriakoff, 1962
Trabanta gilvescens Kiriakoff, 1962
Trabanta rufescens Kiriakoff, 1962
Tricholoba biguttata Berio, 1937
Tricholoba grisescens (Kiriakoff, 1954)
Tricholoba intensiva Gaede, 1928
Tricholoba straminea Kiriakoff, 1960
Trotonotus castaneus Kiriakoff, 1954
Ulinella cotytto Kiriakoff, 1954
Utidaviana citana (Schaus, 1893)
Xanthodonta debilis Gaede, 1928
Xanthodonta lusingae Kiriakoff, 1954

Oecophoridae
Calliphractis gephyropa Meyrick, 1937
Calliphractis tectulata Meyrick, 1937
Carcina haematographa Meyrick, 1937

Plutellidae
Plutella xylostella (Linnaeus, 1758)

Psychidae
Acanthopsyche carbonarius Karsch, 1900
Cuphomantis petrosperma Meyrick, 1935
Eumeta cervina Druce, 1887
Eumeta rougeoti Bourgogne, 1955
Melasina hortatrix Meyrick, 1924
Narycia plana Meyrick, 1919
Psyche flavicapitella (Romieux, 1937)

Pterophoridae
Agdistis facetus Bigot, 1969
Agdistis malitiosa Meyrick, 1909
Emmelina amseli (Bigot, 1969)
Exelastis bergeri Bigot, 1969
Exelastis boireaui Bigot, 1992
Exelastis pilum Gielis, 2009
Fletcherella niphadarcha (Meyrick, 1930)
Hellinsia aethiopicus (Amsel, 1963)
Hellinsia bengtssoni Gielis, 2009
Hellinsia katangae Gielis, 2009
Hellinsia punctata Gielis, 2009
Inferuncus pentheres (Bigot, 1969)
Lantanophaga pusillidactylus (Walker, 1864)
Marasmarcha sisyrodes Meyrick, 1921
Megalorhipida leptomeres (Meyrick, 1886)
Ochyrotica africana (Bigot, 1969)
Oxyptilus erebites Meyrick, 1937
Paulianilus madecasseus Bigot, 1964
Picardia ruwenzoricus (Gielis, 1991)
Platyptilia postbarbata Meyrick, 1938
Platyptilia rhyncholoba Meyrick, 1924
Platyptilia romieuxi Gielis, 2009
Platyptilia rubriacuta Gielis, 2009
Platyptilia sabius (Felder & Rogenhofer, 1875)
Platyptilia strictiformis Meyrick, 1932
Paracapperia esuriens (Meyrick, 1932)
Pterophorus albidus (Zeller, 1852)
Pterophorus ceraunia (Bigot, 1969)
Pterophorus dallastai Gielis, 1991
Pterophorus lampra (Bigot, 1969)
Pterophorus rhyparias (Meyrick, 1908)
Pterophorus spissa (Bigot, 1969)
Sphenarches anisodactylus (Walker, 1864)
Sphenarches bifurcatus Gielis, 2009
Stenodacma cognata Gielis, 2009
Stenoptilodes taprobanes (Felder & Rogenhofer, 1875)
Titanoptilus laniger Bigot, 1969
Xyroptila africana Bigot, 1969

Pyralidae
Ematheudes straminella Snellen, 1872
Endotricha ellisoni Whalley, 1963
Endotricha erythralis Mabille, 1900
Endotricha rosina Ghesquière, 1942
Epicrocis stibiella (Snellen, 1872)
Gymnancyla terminata Meyrick, 1937
Hypsipyla ereboneura Meyrick, 1939
Lamoria surrufa Whalley, 1964
Loryma athalialis (Walker, 1859)
Stemmatophora flammans Bethune-Baker, 1909

Saturniidae
Adafroptilum incana (Sonthonnax, 1899)
Argema kuhnei Pinhey, 1969
Argema mimosae (Boisduval, 1847)
Athletes gigas (Sonthonnax, 1902)
Athletes semialba (Sonthonnax, 1904)
Aurivillius seydeli Rougeot, 1962
Bunaea alcinoe (Stoll, 1780)
Bunaeopsis aurantiaca (Rothschild, 1895)
Bunaeopsis hersilia (Westwood, 1849)
Bunaeopsis jacksoni (Jordan, 1908)
Bunaeopsis licharbas (Maassen & Weymer, 1885)
Bunaeopsis lueboensis Bouvier, 1931
Bunaeopsis oubie (Guérin-Méneville, 1849)
Bunaeopsis princeps (Le Cerf, 1918)
Campimoptilum kuntzei (Dewitz, 1881)
Decachorda bouvieri Hering, 1929
Decachorda fulvia (Druce, 1886)
Decachorda pomona (Weymer, 1892)
Decachorda rosea Aurivillius, 1898
Decachorda seydeli Rougeot, 1970
Epiphora albidus (Druce, 1886)
Epiphora bauhiniae (Guérin-Méneville, 1832)
Epiphora congolana (Bouvier, 1929)
Epiphora intermedia (Rougeot, 1955)
Epiphora marginimacula Joicey & Talbot, 1924
Epiphora obscura Dufrane, 1953
Epiphora rectifascia Rothschild, 1907
Eudaemonia trogophylla Hampson, 1919
Gonimbrasia belina (Westwood, 1849)
Gonimbrasia congolensis Bouvier, 1927
Gonimbrasia osiris (Druce, 1896)
Gonimbrasia rectilineata (Sonthonnax, 1899)
Gonimbrasia tyrrhea (Cramer, 1775)
Gonimbrasia wahlbergii (Boisduval, 1847)
Goodia addita Darge, 2008
Goodia nodulifera (Karsch, 1892)
Goodia nubilata Holland, 1893
Goodia oxytela Jordan, 1922
Goodia thia Jordan, 1922
Goodia unguiculata Bouvier, 1936
Gynanisa ata Strand, 1911
Heniocha marnois (Rogenhofer, 1891)
Holocerina agomensis (Karsch, 1896)
Holocerina angulata (Aurivillius, 1893)
Holocerina intermedia Rougeot, 1978
Holocerina smilax (Westwood, 1849)
Imbrasia allardi Rougeot, 1971
Imbrasia butyrospermi Vuillot, 1911
Imbrasia ertli Rebel, 1904
Imbrasia truncata Aurivillius, 1908
Lobobunaea acetes (Westwood, 1849)
Lobobunaea niepelti Strand, 1914
Lobobunaea phaedusa (Drury, 1782)
Lobobunaea rosea (Sonthonnax, 1899)
Ludia orinoptena Karsch, 1892
Ludia tessmanni Strand, 1911
Melanocera nereis (Rothschild, 1898)
Melanocera parva Rothschild, 1907
Micragone agathylla (Westwood, 1849)
Micragone allardi Darge, 1990
Micragone ansorgei (Rothschild, 1907)
Micragone cana (Aurivillius, 1893)
Micragone elisabethae Bouvier, 1930
Nudaurelia alopia Westwood, 1849
Nudaurelia anthina (Karsch, 1892)
Nudaurelia anthinoides Rougeot, 1978
Nudaurelia eblis Strecker, 1876
Nudaurelia jamesoni (Druce, 1890)
Nudaurelia macrops Rebel, 1917
Nudaurelia macrothyris (Rothschild, 1906)
Nudaurelia nyassana (Rothschild, 1907)
Nudaurelia rhodina (Rothschild, 1907)
Nudaurelia staudingeri Aurivillius, 1893
Nudaurelia wahlbergiana Rougeot, 1972
Orthogonioptilum adiegetum Karsch, 1892
Orthogonioptilum adustum Jordan, 1922
Orthogonioptilum kasaiensis Dufrane, 1953
Orthogonioptilum kivuensis Bouyer, 1990
Orthogonioptilum ochraceum Rougeot, 1958
Orthogonioptilum oremansi Darge, 2008
Orthogonioptilum prox Karsch, 1892
Orthogonioptilum vestigiata (Holland, 1893)
Orthogonioptilum violascens (Rebel, 1914)
Pselaphelia gemmifera (Butler, 1878)
Pselaphelia oremansi Darge, 2008
Pselaphelia vandenberghei Bouyer, 1992
Pseudantheraea discrepans (Butler, 1878)
Pseudantheraea imperator Rougeot, 1962
Pseudaphelia apollinaris (Boisduval, 1847)
Pseudaphelia luteola Bouvier, 1930
Pseudaphelia simplex Rebel, 1906
Pseudimbrasia deyrollei (J. Thomson, 1858)
Pseudobunaea callista (Jordan, 1910)
Pseudobunaea cleopatra (Aurivillius, 1893)
Rohaniella pygmaea (Maassen & Weymer, 1885)
Tagoropsis flavinata (Walker, 1865)
Tagoropsis hanningtoni (Butler, 1883)
Tagoropsis lupina Rothschild, 1907
Tagoropsis rougeoti D. S. Fletcher, 1952
Ubaena fuelleborniana Karsch, 1900
Urota centralis Bouyer, 2008
Urota herbuloti Darge, 1975
Urota sinope (Westwood, 1849)

Schistonoeidae
Oecia oecophila (Staudinger, 1876)

Sesiidae
Chamaesphecia clathrata Le Cerf, 1917
Chamanthedon fulvipes (Hampson, 1910)
Episannina perlucida (Le Cerf, 1911)
Melittia chalconota Hampson, 1910
Melittia hyaloxantha Meyrick, 1928
Paranthrene lodimana (Strand, 1918)
Synanthedon cyanescens (Hampson, 1910)

Sphingidae
Acanthosphinx guessfeldti (Dewitz, 1879)
Acherontia atropos (Linnaeus, 1758)
Afroclanis calcareus (Rothschild & Jordan, 1907)
Afrosataspes galleyi (Basquin, 1982)
Afrosphinx amabilis (Jordan, 1911)
Agrius convolvuli (Linnaeus, 1758)
Antinephele muscosa Holland, 1889
Avinoffia hollandi (Clark, 1917)
Basiothia medea (Fabricius, 1781)
Basiothia schenki (Möschler, 1872)
Cephonodes hylas (Linnaeus, 1771)
Chloroclanis virescens (Butler, 1882)
Daphnis nerii (Linnaeus, 1758)
Euchloron megaera (Linnaeus, 1758)
Falcatula falcata (Rothschild & Jordan, 1903)
Grillotius bergeri (Darge, 1973)
Hippotion balsaminae (Walker, 1856)
Hippotion celerio (Linnaeus, 1758)
Hippotion eson (Cramer, 1779)
Hippotion gracilis (Butler, 1875)
Hippotion irregularis (Walker, 1856)
Hippotion osiris (Dalman, 1823)
Leptoclanis pulchra Rothschild & Jordan, 1903
Leucophlebia afra Karsch, 1891
Lycosphingia hamatus (Dewitz, 1879)
Macroglossum trochilus (Hübner, 1823)
Neopolyptychus consimilis (Rothschild & Jordan, 1903)
Neopolyptychus convexus (Rothschild & Jordan, 1903)
Neopolyptychus pygarga (Karsch, 1891)
Neopolyptychus serrator (Jordan, 1929)
Nephele accentifera (Palisot de Beauvois, 1821)
Nephele bipartita Butler, 1878
Nephele discifera Karsch, 1891
Nephele peneus (Cramer, 1776)
Phylloxiphia bicolor (Rothschild, 1894)
Phylloxiphia goodii (Holland, 1889)
Phylloxiphia illustris (Rothschild & Jordan, 1906)
Phylloxiphia karschi (Rothschild & Jordan, 1903)
Phylloxiphia metria (Jordan, 1920)
Phylloxiphia oberthueri (Rothschild & Jordan, 1903)
Phylloxiphia oweni (Carcasson, 1968)
Phylloxiphia punctum (Rothschild, 1907)
Phylloxiphia vicina (Rothschild & Jordan, 1915)
Platysphinx constrigilis (Walker, 1869)
Platysphinx stigmatica (Mabille, 1878)
Polyptychoides digitatus (Karsch, 1891)
Polyptychoides grayii (Walker, 1856)
Polyptychopsis marshalli (Rothschild & Jordan, 1903)
Polyptychus affinis Rothschild & Jordan, 1903
Polyptychus andosa Walker, 1856
Polyptychus anochus Rothschild & Jordan, 1906
Polyptychus aurora Clark, 1936
Polyptychus barnsi Clark, 1926
Polyptychus bernardii Rougeot, 1966
Polyptychus carteri (Butler, 1882)
Polyptychus coryndoni Rothschild & Jordan, 1903
Polyptychus enodia (Holland, 1889)
Polyptychus hollandi Rothschild & Jordan, 1903
Polyptychus murinus Rothschild, 1904
Polyptychus nigriplaga Rothschild & Jordan, 1903
Polyptychus orthographus Rothschild & Jordan, 1903
Praedora plagiata Rothschild & Jordan, 1903
Pseudoclanis evestigata Kernbach, 1955
Pseudoclanis molitor (Rothschild & Jordan, 1912)
Pseudoclanis occidentalis Rothschild & Jordan, 1903
Rhodafra marshalli Rothschild & Jordan, 1903
Rufoclanis numosae (Wallengren, 1860)
Temnora angulosa Rothschild & Jordan, 1906
Temnora elegans (Rothschild, 1895)
Temnora elisabethae Hering, 1930
Temnora eranga (Holland, 1889)
Temnora griseata Rothschild & Jordan, 1903
Temnora iapygoides (Holland, 1889)
Temnora pseudopylas (Rothschild, 1894)
Temnora radiata (Karsch, 1892)
Temnora reutlingeri (Holland, 1889)
Temnora sardanus (Walker, 1856)
Temnora spiritus (Holland, 1893)
Temnora wollastoni Rothschild & Jordan, 1908
Theretra capensis (Linnaeus, 1764)

Thyrididae
Arniocera cyanoxantha (Mabille, 1893)
Arniocera elliptica Kiriakoff, 1954
Arniocera erythropyga (Wallengren, 1860)
Arniocera inornata Kiriakoff, 1954
Arniocera rectifascia Kiriakoff, 1954
Arniocera vanstraeleni Kiriakoff, 1954
Arniocera viridifasciata (Aurivillius, 1900)
Arniocera zambesina (Walker, 1866)
Byblisia latipes Walker, 1865
Byblisia micans Kiriakoff, 1954
Byblisia setipes (Plötz, 1880)
Cecidothyris longicorpa Whalley, 1971
Chrysotypus medjensis (Holland, 1920)
Dysodia magnifica Whalley, 1968
Epaena radiata (Warren, 1908)
Epaena vocata Whalley, 1971
Gnathodes fiscinella Whalley, 1971
Marmax hyparchus (Cramer, 1779)
Marmax semiaurata (Walker, 1854)
Marmax vicaria (Walker, 1854)
Nakawa fuscibasis (Hampson, 1906)
Netrocera euxantha Hering, 1929
Netrocera jordani Joicey & Talbot, 1921
Netrocera overlaeti Talbot, 1928
Netrocera satanas Hering, 1931
Netrocera seydeli Hering, 1931
Ninia magnifica Alberti, 1957
Ninia plumipes (Drury, 1782)
Ninia saphira Aurivillius, 1900
Trichobaptes auristrigata (Plötz, 1880)

Tineidae
Acridotarsa melipecta (Meyrick, 1915)
Afrocelestis evertata Gozmány, 1965
Argyrocorys niphorrhabda Meyrick, 1938
Catazetema trivialis Gozmány, 1976
Ceratophaga chalcodryas (Meyrick, 1938)
Ceratophaga ethadopa (Meyrick, 1938)
Ceratophaga vastellus (Zeller, 1852)
Cimitra estimata (Gozmány, 1965)
Cimitra fetialis (Meyrick, 1917)
Cimitra horridella (Walker, 1863)
Cimitra platyloxa (Meyrick, 1930)
Cimitra texturata (Gozmány, 1967)
Criticonoma crassa Gozmány & Vári, 1973
Criticonoma episcardina (Gozmány, 1965)
Crobylophanes sericophaea Meyrick, 1938
Crypsithyris auriala (Gozmány, 1967)
Cubitofusa pseudoglebata (Gozmány, 1967)
Cubitofusa seydeli (Gozmány, 1967)
Dasyses archipis Gozmány, 1967
Dasyses centralis Gozmány, 1967
Dasyses colorata Gozmány, 1967
Dasyses dinoptera Gozmány, 1967
Dasyses rugosella (Stainton, 1859)
Dasyses thanatis Gozmány, 1967
Drosica abjectella Walker, 1963
Ectabola extans Gozmány, 1976
Ectabola laxata (Gozmány, 1967)
Ectabola perversa (Gozmány, 1967)
Edosa effulgens (Gozmány, 1965)
Endeixis exalata Gozmány, 1976
Erechthias amphibaphes (Meyrick, 1939)
Exoplisis monopis Gozmány, 1976
Hapsifera equatorialis Gozmány, 1967
Hapsifera glebata Meyrick, 1908
Hapsifera haplotherma Meyrick, 1934
Hapsifera ignobilis Meyrick, 1919
Hapsifera lithocentra Meyrick, 1920
Hapsifera lutea Gozmány, 1967
Hapsifera nidicola Meyrick, 1935
Hapsifera refalcata Gozmány, 1967
Hapsifera revoluta Meyrick, 1914
Heterostasis extricata Gozmány, 1965
Hyperbola zicsii Gozmány, 1965
Machaeropteris baloghi Gozmány, 1965
Machaeropteris ochroptera Gozmány, 1967
Monopis altivagans Meyrick, 1938
Monopis immaculata Gozmány, 1967
Monopis malescripta Meyrick, 1938
Monopis megalodelta Meyrick, 1908
Monopis meyricki Gozmány, 1967
Monopis oriphylax Meyrick, 1924
Monopis rejectella (Walker, 1864)
Monopis rutilicostella (Stainton, 1860)
Monopis speculella (Zeller, 1852)
Morophaga soror Gozmány, 1965
Organodesma arsiptila (Meyrick, 1931)
Organodesma aurocrata Gozmány, 1976
Organodesma optata Gozmány, 1967
Organodesma petaloxantha (Meyrick, 1931)
Organodesma psapharogma (Meyrick, 1936)
Organodesma simplex Gozmány, 1967
Pachypsaltis meyricki Gozmány & Vári, 1973
Pachypsaltis pachystoma (Meyrick, 1920)
Pelecystola polysticha (Meyrick, 1938)
Perissomastix bergeri Gozmány, 1967
Perissomastix breviberbis (Meyrick, 1933)
Perissomastix dentifera Gozmány & Vári, 1973
Perissomastix fulvicoma (Meyrick, 1921)
Perissomastix gabori Gozmány, 1967
Perissomastix lala Gozmány, 1967
Perissomastix melanops Gozmány, 1967
Perissomastix mili Gozmány, 1965
Perissomastix perlata Gozmány, 1967
Perissomastix protaxia (Meyrick, 1924)
Perissomastix pyroxantha (Meyrick, 1914)
Perissomastix titanea Gozmány, 1967
Phereoeca postulata Gozmány, 1967
Phthoropoea oenochares (Meyrick, 1920)
Pitharcha chalinaea Meyrick, 1908
Pitharcha fasciata (Ghesquière, 1940)
Randominta meretrix Gozmány, 1976
Scalmatica zernyi Gozmány, 1967
Setomorpha rutella Zeller, 1852
Silosca licziae Gozmány, 1967
Silosca somnis Gozmány, 1967
Silosca superba Gozmány, 1967
Sphallestasis besucheti Gozmány, 1976
Sphallestasis decipiens (Gozmány, 1967)
Sphallestasis epiforma (Gozmány, 1967)
Sphallestasis magnifica (Gozmány, 1967)
Sphallestasis oenopis (Meyrick, 1908)
Sphallestasis romieuxi Gozmány, 1976
Tinea translucens Meyrick, 1917
Tineola anaphecola Gozmány, 1967
Tiquadra cultrifera Meyrick, 1914
Tiquadra ghesquierei Gozmány, 1967
Tiquadra goochii Walsingham, 1881
Tiquadra ochreata Gozmány, 1967
Trichophaga mormopis Meyrick, 1935
Zygosignata scutigera (Gozmány, 1967)

Tischeriidae
Tischeria urticicolella (Ghesquière, 1940)

Tortricidae
Accra canthararcha (Meyrick, 1937)
Accra rubicunda Razowski, 1966
Accra witteae Razowski, 1964
Acleris ruwenzorica Razowski, 2005
Afroploce ealana Aarvik, 2004
Afroploce karsholti Aarvik, 2004
Agapeta heliochrosta (Meyrick, 1928)
Agapeta limenias (Meyrick, 1928)
Anthozela anonidii Ghesquière, 1940
Apotoforma mayumbeana Razowski, 2012
Brachioxena sparactis (Meyrick, 1928)
Bubonoxena ephippias (Meyrick, 1907)
Capua liparochra Meyrick, 1928
Capua pylora Meyrick, 1938
Clepsis brachyptycta (Meyrick, 1938)
Clepsis enochlodes (Meyrick, 1938)
Clepsis scaeodoxa (Meyrick, 1935)
Congoprinsia juratae Razowski, 2012
Cornesia ormoperla Razowski, 1981
Cornips dryocausta (Meyrick, 1938)
Cornips gravidspinatus Razowski, 2010
Cosmorrhyncha acrocosma (Meyrick, 1908)
Cosmorrhyncha microcosma Aarvik, 2004
Crocidosema plebejana Zeller, 1847
Cryptophlebia peltastica (Meyrick, 1921)
Cydia improbana (Snellen, 1872)
Eccopsis incultana (Walker, 1863)
Eccopsis nebulana Walsingham, 1891
Eccopsis praecedens Walsingham, 1897
Eccopsis wahlbergiana Zeller, 1852
Enarmoniodes mirabilis Ghesquière, 1940
Endothenia euryteles (Meyrick, 1936)
Endothenia vasculigera Meyrick, 1938
Epichoristodes imbriculata Meyrick, 1938
Epichoristodes pylora (Meyrick, 1938)
Eucosma cathareutis (Meyrick, 1938)
Eucosma phaeochyta Bradley, 1965
Eucosma rigens Meyrick, 1938
Eucosma transmutata Meyrick, 1931
Eucosmocydia mixographa (Meyrick, 1939)
Eugnosta chalasma Razowski, 1993
Eugnosta percnoptila (Meyrick, 1933)
Geita bjoernstadi Aarvik, 2004
Grapholita gypsothicta (Meyrick, 1938)
Idiothauma rigatiella (Ghesquière, 1940)
Ioditis capnobactra Meyrick, 1938
Lozotaenia cyanombra (Meyrick, 1935)
Lozotaenia manticopa (Meyrick, 1934)
Lozotaenia myriosema (Meyrick, 1936)
Lumaria petrophora (Meyrick, 1938)
Meridemis hylaeana (Ghesquière, 1940)
Metamesia elegans (Walsingham, 1881)
Neorrhyncha congolana Aarvik, 2004
Nepheloploce nephelopyrga (Meyrick, 1938)
Olethreutes percnochlaena (Meyrick, 1938)
Recaraceria hormoterma (Meyrick, 1938)
Rubidograptis praeconia (Meyrick, 1937)
Rutilograptis couteauxi (Ghesquière, 1940)
Sanguinograptis albardana (Snellen, 1872)
Strepsicrates rhothia (Meyrick, 1910)
Sycacantha nereidopa (Meyrick, 1927)
Sycacantha orphnogenes (Meyrick, 1939)
Sycacantha regionalis (Meyrick, 1934)
Tetramoera isogramma (Meyrick, 1908)
Thylacogaster monospora (Meyrick, 1939)
Tortrix triadelpha Meyrick, 1920
Xeneboda congo Razowski, 2012
Xeneboda mayumbea Razowski, 2012

Uraniidae
Acropteris hypocrita Snellen, 1872
Acropteris mendax Snellen, 1872
Acropteris tenella (Walker, ????)
Aploschema albaria (Plötz, 1880)
Dissoprumna erycinaria (Guenée, 1857)

Zygaenidae
Aethioprocris congoensis Alberti, 1957
Alteramenelikia jordani (Alberti, 1954)
Astyloneura difformis (Jordan, 1907)
Astyloneura esmeralda (Hampson, 1920)
Astyloneura gaedei Alberti, 1957
Astyloneura incerta Alberti, 1957
Astyloneura meridionalis (Hampson, 1920)
Astyloneura monotona Hering, 1931
Astyloneura nitens Jordan, 1907
Chalconycles chloauges (Holland, 1893)
Epiorna abessynica (Koch, 1865)
Epiorna ochreipennis (Butler, 1874)
Saliunca cyanea Hampson, 1920
Saliunca flavifrons (Plötz, 1880)
Saliunca meruana Aurivillius, 1910
Saliunca mimetica Jordan, 1907
Saliunca orphnina Hering, 1931
Saliunca pallida Alberti, 1957
Saliunca styx (Fabricius, 1775)
Saliunca ventralis Jordan, 1907
Saliunca vidua Rebel, 1914
Syringura pulchra (Butler, 1876)
Syringura triplex (Plötz, 1880)
Tascia instructa (Walker, 1854)
Xenoprocris jordani Romieux, 1937
Zutulba namaqua (Boisduval, 1847)

References

External links 

Moths
Moths
Congo, Democratic Republic
Congo, Democratic Republic